= Daroma =

Southern Hebron Hills in late antiquity

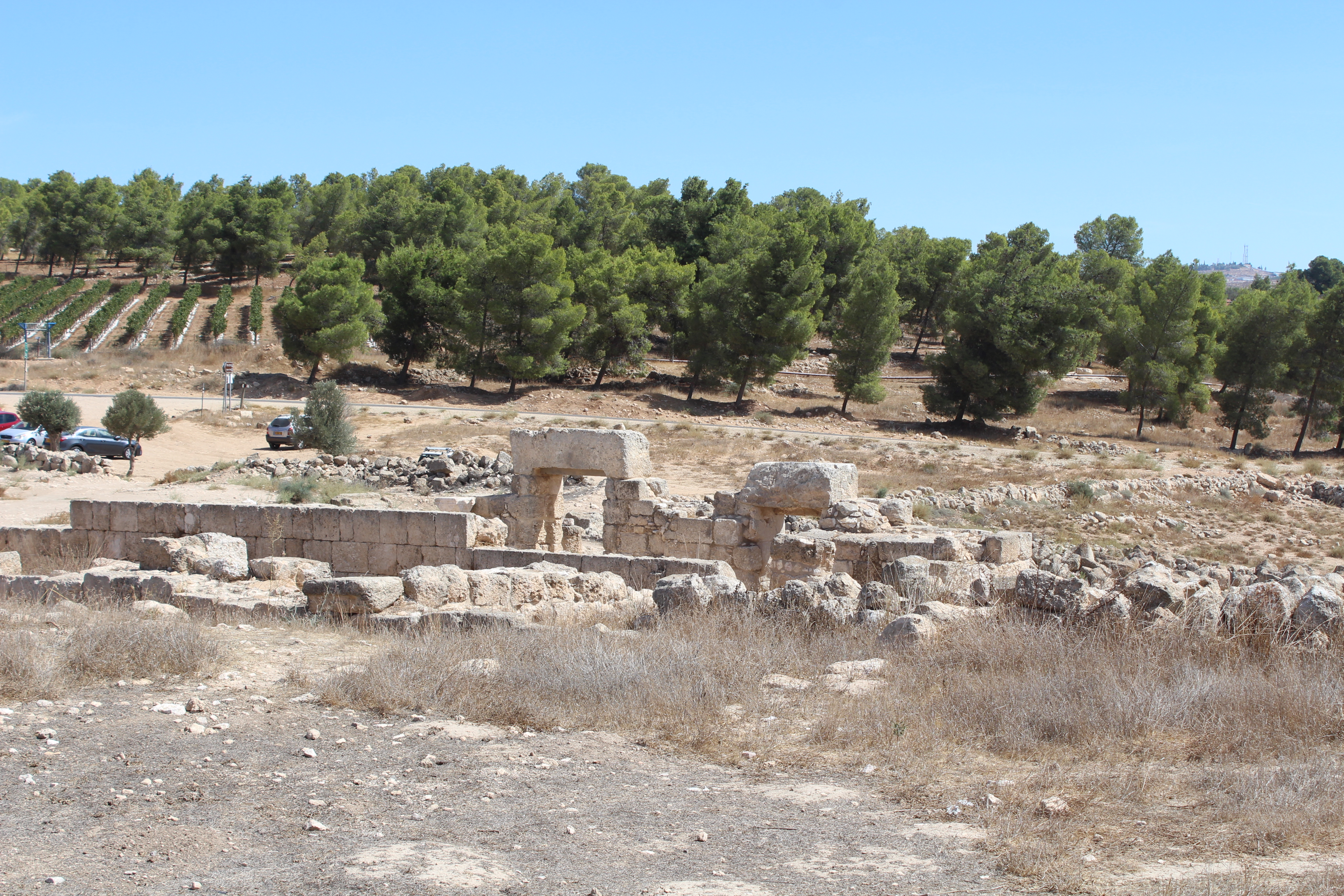
Remains of the synagogue of Anim, one of several ancient towns located in Daroma

Daroma (Aramaic) or Darom (Hebrew), both meaning 'South', was the name of the southern Hebron Hills in the Late Roman and Byzantine periods. The term is used in Eusebius's Onomasticon (4th century) and in rabbinic literature. By the late tenth century, the Arab geographer al-Muqaddasi ('the Jerusalemite') was still referring to part of the region of Beth Guvrin by this name.

In late antiquity, the term "Daroma" referred to the region extending from Ein Gedi, near the Dead Sea, to Eleutheropolis (Beth Govrin), a prominent city of the time. Its northern boundary was marked by Hebron and Mamre. For Eusebius, it is the southern part of the territory of Eleutheropolis. Eusebius also mentioned several large Jewish villages in Daroma. The region's Jewish inhabitants were particularly devoted to Hebrew.

== History ==
=== Late Roman and Byzantine periods ===
==== Geographical outline ====
In late antiquity, the 'borders' of the Daroma region were marked to the north by Mamre and nearby Hebron, to the east by En Gedi on the Dead Sea and to the west by the territory of Eleutheropolis.

==== Post-revolt demographics ====
Jodi Magness writes that the defeat of the Bar Kokhba Revolt in 135 led to the depopulation of Jewish inhabitants throughout most of Judaea, with the exception of Daroma. Here the Jewish population actually peaked after the revolt due to incoming refugees, reaching sizable numbers. Hagith Sivan states that Daroma, while constituting the core of Jewish settlement in Judaea up until the Bar Kokhba Revolt (132–135), was largely emptied of its Jewish population in the aftermath of the revolt. Mamre turned into the main slave market for the captured Jews and the surplus was sent on to Gaza.

Gideon Avni notes that after 135, the Hebron Hills were demographically divided into two distinct sub-regions: in the northern part there were just Christian villages built atop destroyed former Jewish ones, while in the southern Hebron Hills there were both Jewish and Christian communities. By c. 300, Eusebius is describing seven contemporary large Jewish villages in Daroma region: Juttah, Carmel, Eshtemoa, Rimmon, Tele, Lower Anim, and Ein Gedi.

The Jewish population in the southern Hebron Hills apparently consisted of those who had remained in place after the Bar Kokhba revolt, then joined by Jewish migrants from Galilee. The latter might have arrived during the time of Judah the Prince, who managed to have good relations with the Roman authorities.

There is evidence for the region also being inhabited by pagans and Jewish Christians during that period.

==== Jewish culture ====
Archaeology has shown that Jewish settlements were typically built around a synagogue, with those of Eshtemoa, Maon, Susya, Rimmon and Anim being particularly notable. The edifice from En Gedi is also counted among the "Daroma synagogues".

Jerome studied Hebrew with Jewish teachers from Daroma, a typical situation in those early days of Christianity, with strong Christian learning centres immediately to the north, in Jerusalem and Bethlehem. The Daromean Jews were famed as "fanatic linguists", who were very strict with Hebrew pronunciation. This must be seen in connection with the ornamentation of synagogues from the area, which show that efforts were made to imitate rituals specific to the destroyed Jerusalem Temple, possibly due to the presence of refugees from priestly families who had escaped from the former Jewish capital. Funerary inscriptions as well as such from worship houses showing gratitude to donors, were written in Hebrew, in contrast with those from Galilee, where Greek or Aramaic were preferred. These are seen as aspects of a conscious attempt at creating associations with the former times of religious glory.

=== Early Islamic period ===
Al-Muqaddasi or al-Maqdisi (c. 945/946–991), who lived during the Abbasid and Fatimid Caliphates, knew the Daroma region by its Arabic corruption, ad-Dārūm, but was well aware of its older name:

"[Bayt Jibrin] is a city partly in the hill country, partly in the plain. Its territory has the name of Ad Darum (the ancient Daroma and the modern Dairan)....It is an emporium for the neighbouring country, and a land of riches and plenty, possessing fine domains."

== See also ==
- Daroma oil lamps, c. 1st century to 2nd half of 2nd century CE. Manufactured in several places across Israel, southern as well as northern, but named after the term used in rabbinic sources for southern Judaea. Decoration motifs were kept in accordance with contemporary Jewish law, indicating that they were produced and used by Jews.

== Bibliography ==
- Le Strange, G. (1890). Palestine Under the Moslems: A Description of Syria and the Holy Land from A.D. 650 to 1500. Committee of the Palestine Exploration Fund.
- Al-Muqaddasi (1994). The Best Divisions for Knowledge of the Regions. Ahsan al-Taqasim Fi Ma'rifat al-Aqalim. Translated by Basil Anthony Collins. Reading: Garnet Publishing. ISBN 1-873938-14-4.
