= Hebron Hills =

Hills in the West Bank

Coordinates: 31°26′N 35°0′E

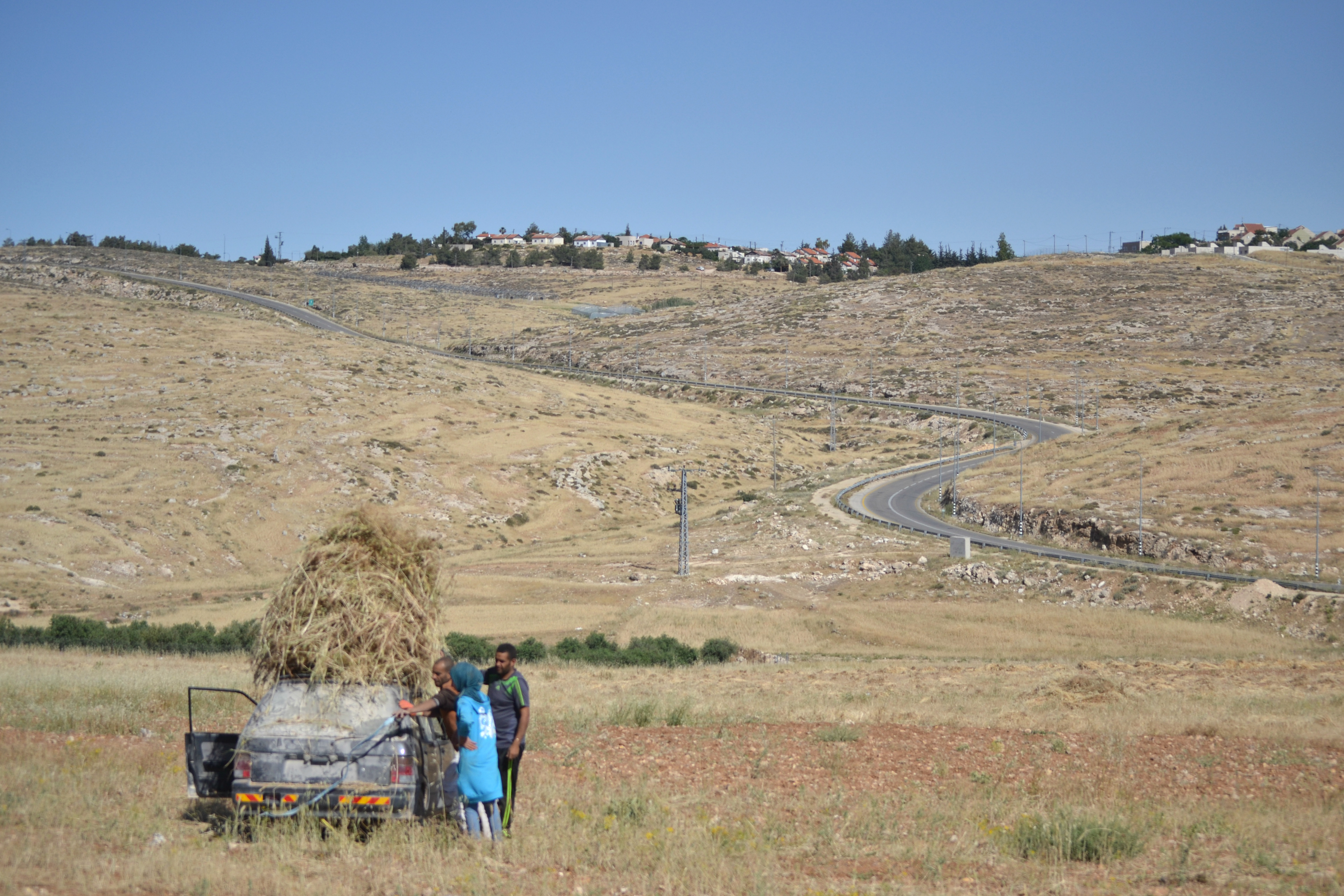
- Harvesting in the South Hebron Hills

Highest point
- Elevation: 1,026 m (3,366 ft)
- Prominence: 1,026 m (3,366 ft)

Naming
- Native name: جبل الخليل (Arabic); הר חברון (Hebrew)

Geography
- Location: West Bank
- Parent range: Judean Mountains

The Hebron Hills, also known as Mount Hebron (Arabic: جبل الخليل, romanized: Jabal al-Khalīl; Hebrew: הר חברון, romanized: Har Khevron), are a mountain ridge, geographic region, and geologic formation, constituting the southern part of the Judean Mountains. They are located in the southern West Bank, Palestine.

During the Iron Age, the Hebron Hills were part of the Kingdom of Judah, which underwent a forced exile after being conquered by the Babylonians. Subsequently, in the Hellenistic period, an Edomite population migrating to the area became dominant, leading to its being referred to as Idumaea. The Edomites later converted to Judaism and assimilated into the Jewish population. Despite many settlements being destroyed or abandoned due to the brutal suppression of the Bar Kokhva revolt, a Jewish presence persisted in the area.

In the Late Roman and Byzantine periods, the Hebron Hills were divided demographically into a Christian northern part and a mixed Jewish-Christian southern area. During this time, the southern Hebron Hills became known as Daroma, meaning "South" in Hebrew and Aramaic. Several synagogues from this period have been unearthed in the region. Following the Muslim conquest of the Levant, the Jewish population in the area declined as Muslims became dominant.

In the Ottoman period, Mount Hebron served as a stop for farmers and herders, primarily from the deserts of Arabia and Transjordan, who migrated due to factors like severe drought. Between the 17th and 19th centuries, Mount Hebron experienced extensive violence involving rival families and Bedouins, leading to migrations and the destruction of many villages.

== Geography ==
The highest peak of the mountain ridge is in the Palestinian city of Halhul, where a tableland exists with an altitude of 1,026 metres (3,366 ft).

== History ==
=== Iron Age ===
The Book of Joshua mentions Maon, Carmel, Adora, and Juttah among others as part of the tribal territory of the Tribe of Judah. The modern Arabic names of Ma'in, al-Karmil, Dura, and Yatta respectively preserve the ancient names.

As the Nabataeans pushed northwards, the Edomites were driven out of old Edom to the south of the Dead Sea and into the southern Hebron Hills between the southern part of the Dead Sea and the Mediterranean, establishing new Edom or Idumaea.

=== Hellenistic period ===
During the Hellenistic period, the Edomites became the dominant population of the southern Hebron Hills. Under Ptolemaic rule, the area became a separate administrative unit known as Idumea, named after its inhabitants. Marisa became its administrative center, with Ziph and Adoraim being of secondary importance.

Hellenistic rule brought Greek and Phoenician culture into Idumea, while the prevalence of male circumcision shows a growing affinity with Judaism.

In 113-112 BCE, the region was captured by the John Hyrcanus, who converted the Edomites to Judaism and incorporated Idumaea into the Hasmonean kingdom.

=== Roman period ===
The region took part in the Bar Kokhva revolt against the Roman Empire (132-135 CE). The revolt left many settlements in the area destroyed or abandoned, and some of its residents migrated to the Galilee. However, while many areas in Judea proper were depopulated during the revolt and subsequently resettled by foreigners loyal to the Romans, the southern Hebron Hills stood out with its continuing, albeit diminished, Jewish presence. In his Geography, written around 150 CE, Claudius Ptolemy describes Idumea as a desolate area, in contrast to the relative density in the rest of the country north of Idumea to the Galilee.

=== Late Roman and Byzantine period ===
During the Late Roman and Byzantine periods, the Hebron Hills were demographically divided into two distinct sub-regions. In the northern part, Christian settlements were established atop the remains of previously destroyed Jewish villages. Meanwhile, the southern Hebron Hills were inhabited by both Jewish and Christian communities. There is evidence that the region was also inhabited by pagans and Jewish Christians during that period.

During the same period, the southern Hebron Hills became known as Darom or Daroma (Hebrew and Aramaic for "South"). This term appears in rabbinic literature and in Eusebius' Onomasticon. In his Onomasticon, Eusebius mentions seven Jewish settlements that existed in his time in the southern Hebron Hills: Juttah, Carmel, Eshtemoa, Rimmon, Tele, Lower Anim, and Ein Gedi. Archaeological finds confirm the existence of Jewish and Christian settlements in Yatta, al-Karmil, as-Samu, Zif, Maon, Kfar Aziz, Eaton, Gomer, Kishor, Tela, Rimon, and Aristobolia. Jewish settlements were typically built surrounding a synagogue.

The Jewish population in the southern Hebron Hills appears to have consisted of the descendants of the Jewish residents who remained in the area after the Bar Kokhba revolt, in addition to Jewish migrants from Galilee who joined them. This influx might have occurred during the time of Judah ha-Nasi, who maintained positive relations with the Roman authorities.

In the southern Hebron Hills, four synagogues dating from the Talmudic period have been unearthed: Eshtemoa, Susiya, Maon, and 'Anim. These synagogues share common architectural features that set them apart from others found in the Land of Israel. The Eshtemoa synagogue was excavated in the mid-1930s and was initially considered architecturally unique, being classified as 'transitional' between early and late synagogues. Later excavation of the Susiya synagogue revealed significant similarities between the two, leading scholars to categorize the synagogues of the area as a distinct architectural group. Between 1987 and 1990, excavations at the Maon and 'Anim synagogues revealed both similarities and differences compared to those in Eshtemoa and Susiya.

=== Early Islamic period ===
Following the Muslim conquest of the Levant, the Jewish population in the southern Hebron Hills had been gradually replaced by Muslims. During the early Islamic period, the synagogues of Susya and Eshtemoa were repurposed as mosques. It remains unclear whether local Jews had fled the area or had converted to Islam.

Some Palestinians residing in the Hebron Hills, most notably the Makhamras of Yatta, view themselves as having Jewish ancestry.

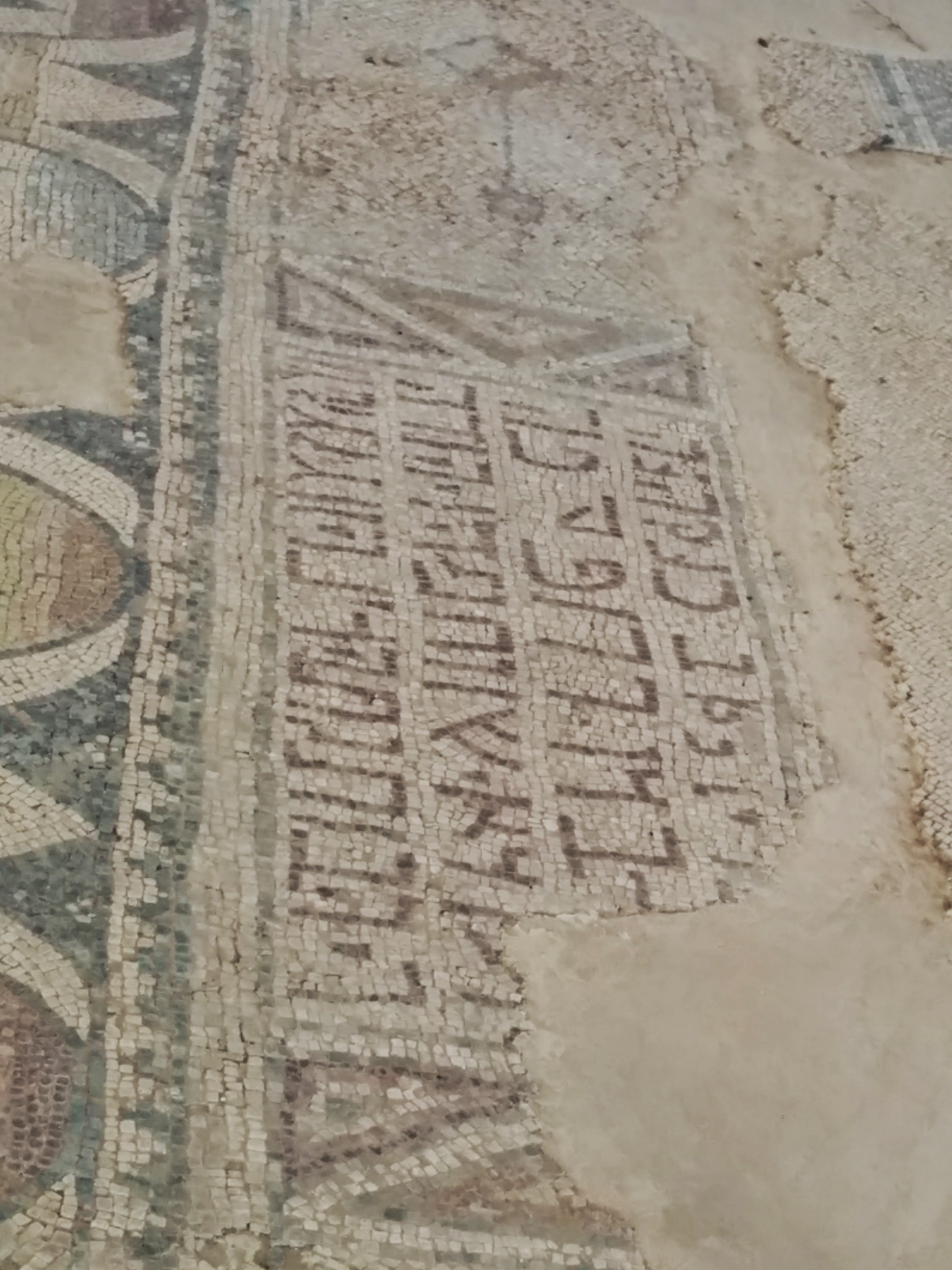
Mosaic floor of the Maon synagogue

=== Crusader period ===
During the Crusades, at the time of the Kingdom of Jerusalem, all the Hebron Hills fell under the dominion of the seigneurie of St. Abraham.

=== Ottoman period ===
In the 16th century, Mount Hebron came under Ottoman rule. Findings indicate that during the 17th and 18th centuries, Mount Hebron witnessed widespread violence, resulting in significant migrations and hegemony changes. Travelers' accounts from the late 17th to the early 19th century documented violence in the Hebron area, especially in its northern fringe, where conflicts between Hebron and Bethlehem districts led to the destruction of many villages. Limited information on southern Mount Hebron suggests a common practice of spending part of the year in caves and underground caverns.

In the years before Muhammad Ali of Egypt took control of the Levant (1831-1840) and the following two decades, the area faced ongoing insecurity. The struggle for control over Mount Hebron between rival groups in Dura led to a violent conflict, drawing in nearby Bedouin tribes and prompting local residents to relocate to cave dwellings.

In the 19th century, there were instances of peasants from Transjordan moving to Hebron, driven by long droughts in their home areas. This migration provided labor for growing grains commercially in the Bayt Jibrin area, not far from western Hebron.

Both fellahin and Bedouins relied on their livestock as a form of "insurance" during droughts, prompting them to migrate following the rains and adopt a nomadic lifestyle not only in the Hebron Hills but also in other parts of Palestine. This phenomenon is particularly prevalent in Yatta and as-Samu, where droughts are frequent. Sometimes, this prolonged nomadism led to permanent migration to more hospitable areas. Consequently, rural communities from the Hebron Hills emerged in regions such as Nablus and Dothan in the northern West Bank, as well as in Wadi 'Ara and the Manasseh Hills.

=== Modern era ===
In recent times, several areas where traditional Palestinian herding communities live have been declared restricted military zones, forcing the displacement of many families. Several Israeli settlements have been established in the area. The Israeli military administration regards the area as a high priority for the demolition of Palestinian homes.

The Palestinian population is frequently subjected to violence at the hands of the settler population, including arson attacks.

== Population ==
Several Palestinian Muslim clans residing in the Hebron Hills are purported to have or claim Jewish ancestry. The Makhamra family, based in Yatta, has a tradition of tracing their ancestry back to a Jewish tribe of Khaybar. They have preserved various customs resembling Jewish practices. In Halhul, the Sawarah clan and the Shatrit family are reputed to have Jewish origins. Traditions of Jewish ancestry have also been noted in Dura and Beit Ummar.

Palestinian anthropologist Ali Qleibo noted that residents of as-Samu and Yatta identify as Qaysi, pure Arabs from Hejaz, with genealogical records tracing back to the Arabian Desert. However, in the southern Hebron Hills, the prevalent genetic makeup features alleles for blonde hair, fair skin, and blue eyes, which he says could be attributed to Crusaders or cross-cousin marriage. Qleibo found it curious that the genetic characteristics of Beit Ummar's population, who consider themselves descendants of a Crusader prince converted to Islam over seven centuries ago, predominantly exhibit typical Arabian traits, including white skin and jet-black hair.

== Flora and fauna ==
The Hebron Hills form the southern and eastern border of Mediterranean vegetation in the region of Palestine.

A 2012 survey by the Israel Nature and Parks Authority discovered 54 rare plant species in the region, more than half of them in cultivated fields. They include Boissiera squarrosa, a type of grass; Legousia hybrida, a plant from the bellflower family; and Reseda globulosa, a rare mignonette.

The region has been known for its vineyards since biblical times. Palestinians and Israelis (from both parts of the Green Line) continue to farm grapes in this region. Local wineries include Yatir Winery.

== See also ==
- Biodiversity of Israel and Palestine
- Hebron Governorate
- Har Hevron Regional Council
- No Other Land
