= Closterman =

Closterman is a surname. Notable people with the surname include:

- John Closterman (1660–1711), German painter
- Winona Closterman (1877–1944), American tennis player

== See also ==
- Pierre Clostermann (1921–2006), World War II French fighter pilot
- Klosterman
- Klostermann
- Kloosterman
