= Kings of Judah Trail =

Thematic hiking and heritage trail in the Judean Lowlands, Israel

The Kings of Judah Trail is a 100-kilometre thematic heritage trail in the southern Judean Lowlands (Shfela) of Israel, connecting 32 archaeological sites dating from the period of the Kingdom of Judah (c. 1020–586 BCE) through the Byzantine period. The trail runs from Horvat Rimmon in Lahav Forest in the south to Gal'on Fortress (Metzudat Galon) near Beit Guvrin in the north, passing through the territories of three regional councils: Yo'av, Lachish, and Bnei Shimon.

== Background and development ==
The Kings of Judah Trail was conceived by archaeologist Sa'ar Ganor of the Israel Antiquities Authority (IAA), who identified the thematic and geographic potential of the sites in the eastern Lachish district.

Formal development of the trail began in 2017 as a joint initiative of the Israel Antiquities Authority, Keren Kayemeth LeIsrael – Jewish National Fund (KKL-JNF), the Israel Nature and Parks Authority, and the Tsiyanei Derech heritage programme of the Ministry of Jerusalem and Heritage. By 2021, the trail incorporated 32 archaeological sites and extended approximately 100 kilometres, accessible on foot and by off-road vehicle via unpaved and paved roads alike.

== Route ==
The trail traverses the southern Judean Lowlands from north to south with three main entry points:

- Northern terminus — Gal'on Fortress (Metzudat Galon), Beit Guvrin Forest
- Central entry — Horvat Al-Ra'i, Shahariya Forest
- Southern terminus — Horvat Rimmon, Lahav Forest

The trail passes through all three sections of the Judean Lowlands — northern, central, and southern Shfela — crossing forested areas managed by KKL-JNF alongside open agricultural and archaeological landscapes. Approximately 100 kilometres of the route can be walked on foot or explored by vehicle on dirt roads.

== Archaeological sites ==
The 32 sites along the trail span multiple historical periods:

- Iron Age / First Temple period (c. 1020–586 BCE) — fortresses, cities, and administrative centres from the period of the Kingdom of Judah, including sites associated with the United Monarchy of David and Solomon.
- Second Temple period — settlements and structures from the period of Hasmonean rule, including a recently excavated Hasmonean fortress.
- Bar Kokhba revolt (132–135 CE) — sites linked to the Bar Kokhba revolt against Roman rule.
- Byzantine period — churches, monasteries, and agricultural installations from the 4th–7th centuries CE.

Notable individual sites include Horvat Al-Ra'i, which has been proposed by excavators from the IAA as a candidate for biblical Ziklag — the city given to David by the Philistine king Achish — a claim that attracted significant international media attention following excavations in 2019. The trail also passes Salome's Cave (Me'arat Salome), traditionally associated with Salome, the midwife of Jesus, and a Hasmonean-period fortress recently uncovered by IAA excavations.

== Signage and symbol ==
As of 2022, formal trail marking along the full route had not yet been completed; however, the individual sites had received extensive development and standardised signage. The official symbol of the Kings of Judah Trail — displayed on site signage — is a 10th-century BCE storage jar (pithos), a vessel type characteristic of Iron Age Judah, with a trail marker passing through it in three colours: blue, green, and brown.

== See also ==
- Israel National Trail
- Jesus Trail
- Hiking in Israel
- Kingdom of Judah
- Israel Antiquities Authority
- Keren Kayemeth LeIsrael
