= Klosterman =

Klosterman is a surname. Notable people with the surname include:

- Chuck Klosterman (born 1972), American writer
- Don Klosterman (disambiguation), multiple people
- Gail Klosterman, fictional character in The Last Man on Earth
- Steve Klosterman, American volleyball player

== See also ==
- Klostermann
