= Klostermann =

Klostermann is a German surname. Notable people with the surname include:

- August Klostermann (1837–1915), German theologian
- Erich Klostermann (1870–1963), German New Testament scholar; son of August Klostermann
- Karel Klostermann (1848–1923), Czech and Austrian writer
- Lukas Klostermann (born 1996), German footballer

== See also ==
- Closterman
- Pierre Clostermann (1921–2006), World War II French fighter pilot
- Kloosterman
