= Eshtemoa synagogue =

Former ancient synagogue in Hebron, West Bank, Palestine

Eshtemoa Synagogue
- אשׁתמע (Hebrew)
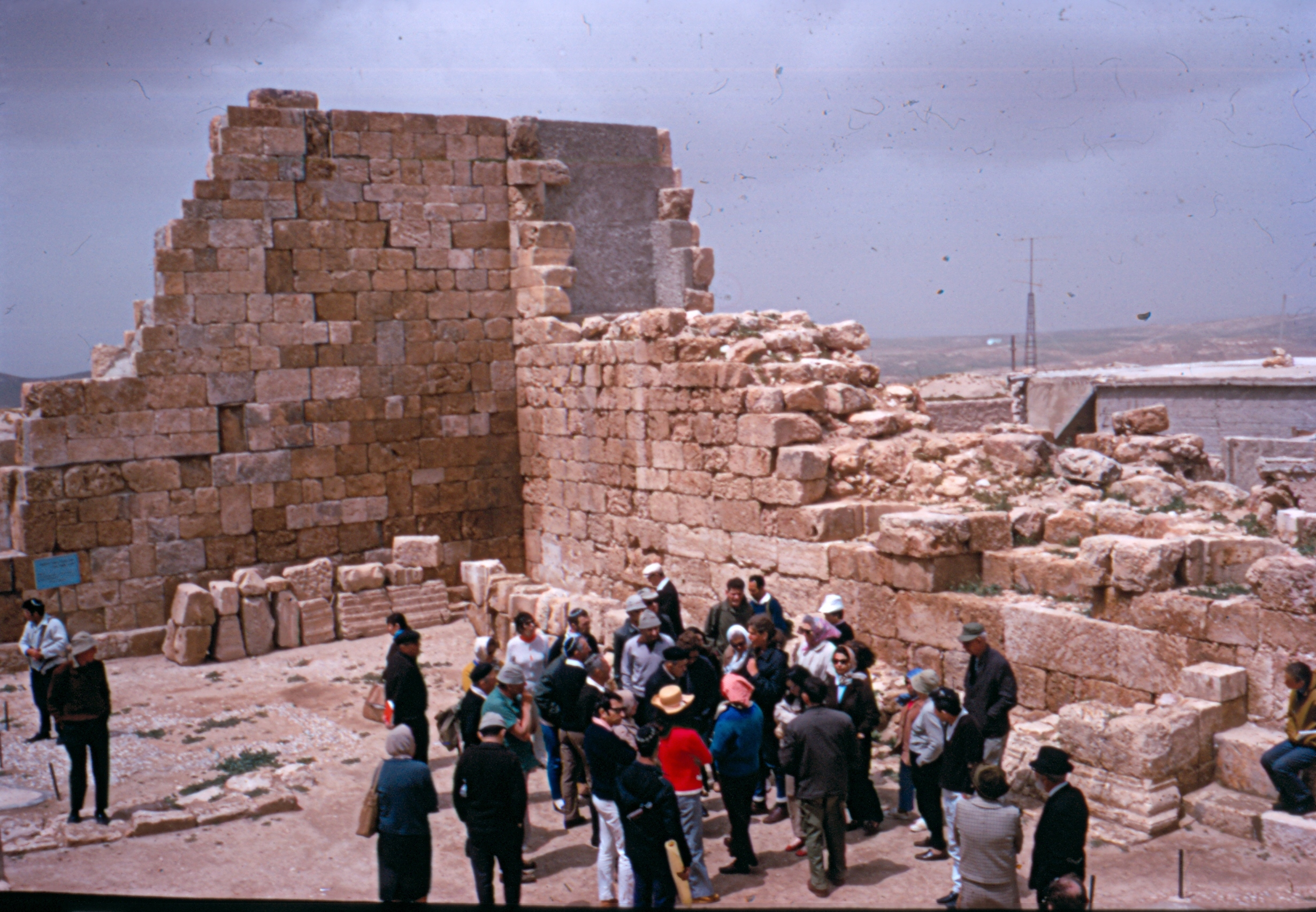

- Location of the former ancient synagogue in the West Bank

Religion
- Affiliation: Judaism (former)
- Region: Hebron Hills (Daroma)
- Ecclesiastical or organisational status: Ancient synagogue; Archeological site
- Status: Ruins

Location
- Location: as-Samu, West Bank
- Country: State of Palestine
- Coordinates: 31°24′03″N 35°04′01″E

Architecture
- Type: Broadhouse
- Completed: 4th–5th century CE

Site notes
- Excavation dates: 1935–36, 1969–70
- Archaeologists: Leo Aryeh Mayer; Adolf Reifenberg; Ze'ev Yeivin

The Eshtemoa synagogue is an ancient Jewish synagogue, dating from the late-Roman and Byzantine periods, uncovered in the modern town of as-Samu' (ancient Eshtemoa) in the southern Hebron Hills of the West Bank, Palestine.

The synagogue is a rectangular building oriented roughly east–west, with an eastern exedra. Three entrances in the east wall lead from the exedra into a single large prayer hall. Inside, the northern wall is especially massive and incorporates three elevated niches: a central, wider niche flanked by two narrower ones. Benches of ashlar stone run along much of the northern and southern walls, and both the exedra and the hall were paved with mosaic floors, including a decorated pavement.

During the Islamic era the synagogue was converted into a mosque. The site was excavated in 1935–36 and 1969–70.

== Archaeological research ==
The ancient synagogue came to light in modern As-Samu, today a Palestinian Arab town generally identified with Eshtemoa, the Levitical city of Judah mentioned in the Book of Joshua and the Book of Samuel. Eusebius, a Christian bishop writing in the late Roman period, describes Eshtemoa as a large Jewish village. Scholars had long suspected the presence of a synagogue there, thanks to early travellers who noted carved stones bearing menorahs and other Jewish motifs reused in village homes, though the exact spot remained uncertain until the 1930s.

In November 1934 Leo Aryeh Mayer and Adolf Reifenberg surveyed as-Samu to search for the location of a synagogue. At the highest point in the village they identified the standing remains of a wall. After delays due to a reluctant landowner, Mayer and Reifenberg began excavations in late 1935 and work was curtailed in 1936 due to the 1936–1939 Arab revolt in Palestine. A part remained inaccessible due to the presence of houses that had been built on the site after the synagogue had fallen out of use. They established the layout of the synagogue and described, among other features, a recessed niche 2.08 metres (6 ft 10 in) above ground level in one of the walls that the excavators interpreted as well have held the Torah ark. A much fuller exposure of the building followed in 1969–70, when Ze'ev Yeivin directed a systematic excavation that removed later additions and domestic structures in order to reveal the original synagogue more completely.

== Architecture and description ==
The synagogue at Eshtemoa was a rectangular building and measured 17.0 by 27.5 metres (55.8 by 90.2 ft) externally. It is a "broad-house" type, which is uncommon amongst synagogues in Palestine. The western wall is the best preserved part of the synagogue and in the 1930s stood to a height of 8.35 m (27 ft). The synagogue had an open-fronted porch or exedra on the eastern side, approached by three broad steps. These steps were constructed directly over an earlier paved roadway, showing that the synagogue was built after the road and aligned independently of it. Two large stone pillars flanked the porch, and column bases found on the upper step indicate that a row of columns once supported its roof. Portions of a mosaic floor survive in this area, including the remains of a dedicatory inscription in Aramaic in which a donor, Eleazar the priest, and his sons are commemorated. It is one of several synagogues from the same era found in this region, alongside the examples of Susiya, Maon, and 'Anim.

Three doorways in the eastern façade led from the porch into the main hall, with the central entrance significantly wider than the flanking ones. These openings, framed by carved mouldings, do not lead into aisles but into a single broad interior space. This arrangement is considerably different from the multi-aisled plan in some northern synagogues as documented in Galilee. The eastern wall was built of large, well-cut ashlar blocks, and later alterations, probably after the synagogue had ceased functioning, closed the two smaller entrances and narrowed the central one using reused masonry.

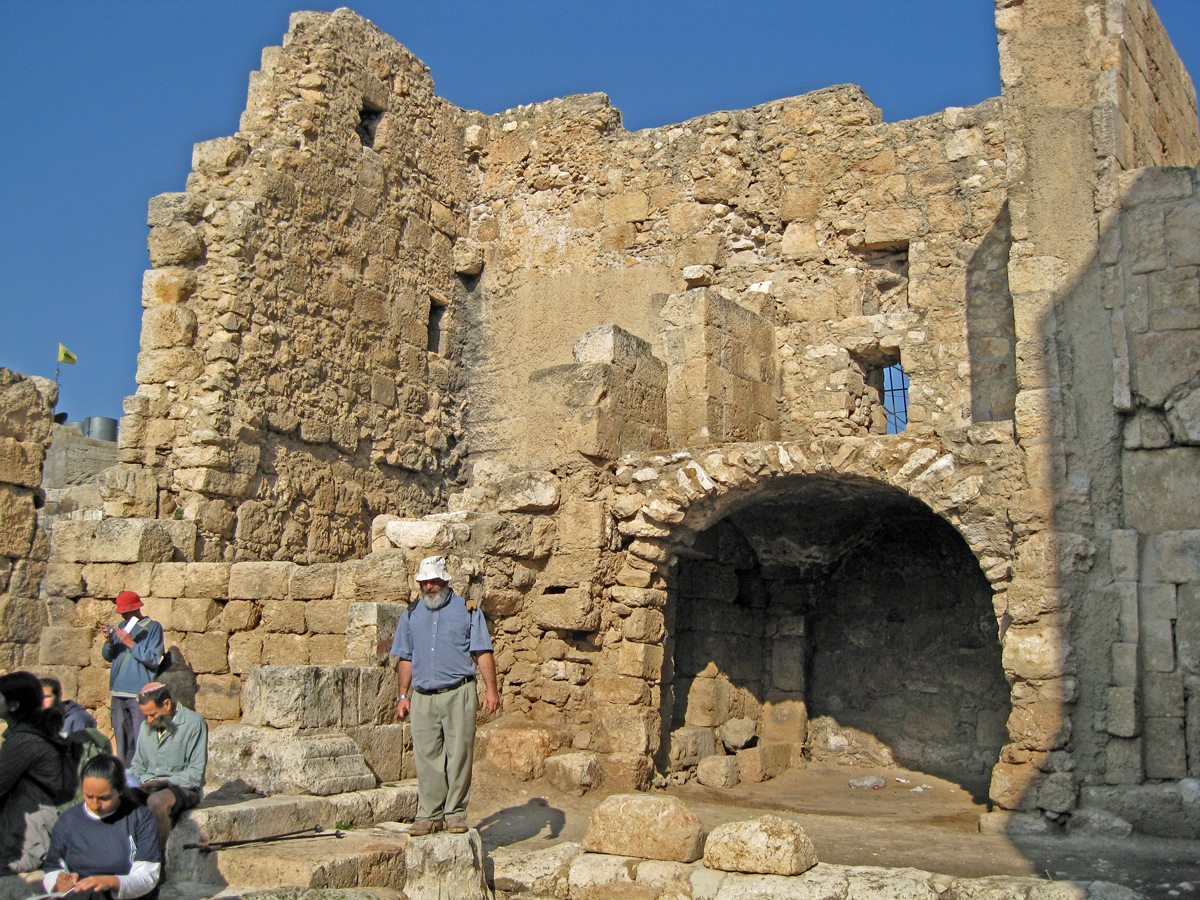
Ruins of the Synagogue

Inside, the building was designed without interior columns; its roof was instead carried by exceptionally thick walls, particularly the northern one. Set into the middle of that northern wall are three elevated niches, including a large central recess with two smaller ones on either side. A raised platform or bema, now largely destroyed, projected from the base of these niches into the hall. Four seven-branched menorahs were discovered carved onto door lintels and one of them is displayed in Jerusalem's Rockefeller Museum. Remains of marble menorahs were also found, indicating that the central niche once held the Torah ark while the side niches likely supported menorah stands, an arrangement known from other Judean synagogues. Along the northern and southern walls of the synagogue were built two long benches, one on top of the other, of which only remnants remain.

The main hall originally had a mosaic floor, though only patches survive today. These include areas of geometric decoration and sections paved with larger white tesserae, probably representing later repairs. The southern side of the hall underwent significant alteration when the building was converted into a mosque after the Muslim conquest of the Levant, with the installation of a semicircular mihrab (Niche in a mosque indicating the direction of prayer) and internal partition walls that divided the space into multiple rooms.

== Later history ==
=== Islamic era ===
During Muslim rule the synagogue was converted into a mosque and a mihrab was added in its southern wall. There are several theories when the conversion took place. Mayer and Reifenberg who excavated the site suggested the Umayyad period; local tradition holds that it happened during Saladin's rule in the 12th century; and scholar Robert Schick suggests that the conversion may have taken place in the 10th century.

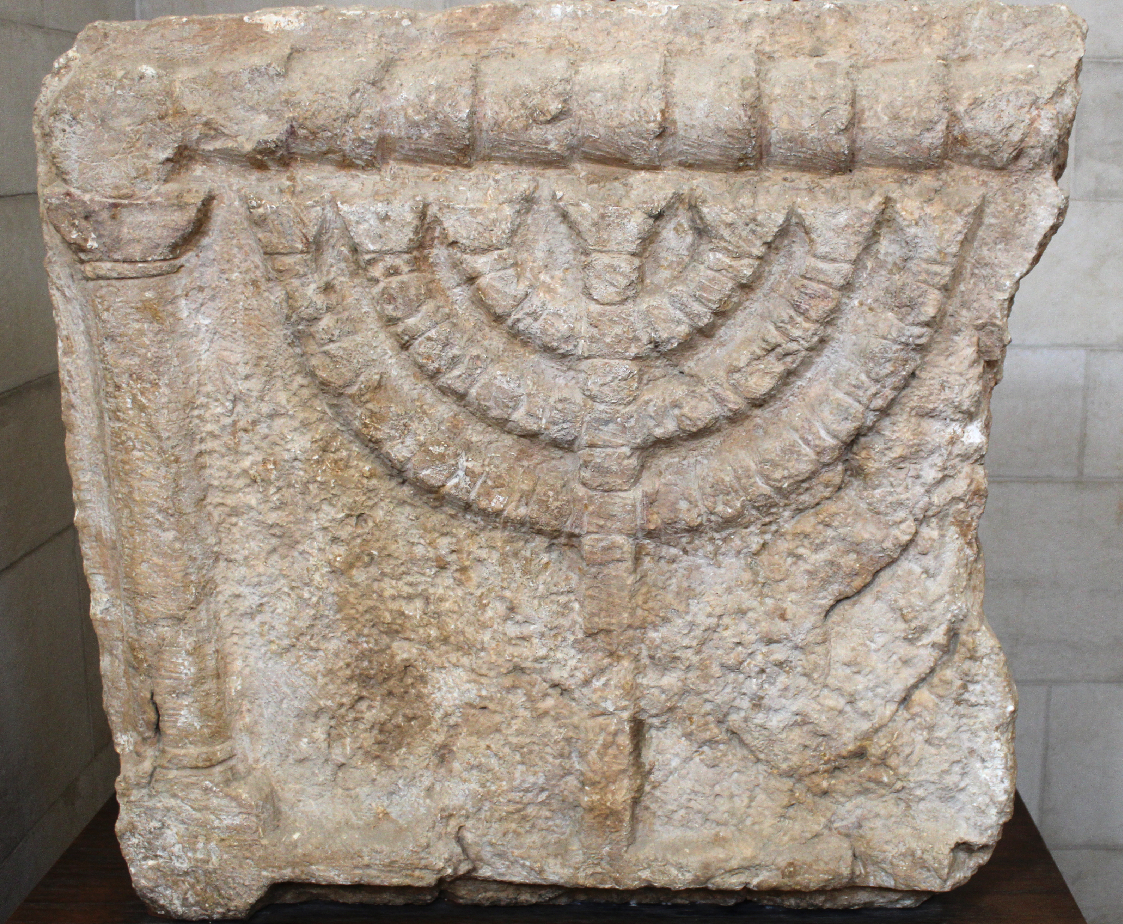
Seven-branched menorah from the Eshtemoa synagogue. Rockefeller Museum

A Crusader church was constructed near the eastern side of the synagogue in the 12th century.

=== Modern era ===
Many architectural elements of the building have been reused in the modern village.

Following the Six-Day War in 1967 Israel occupied the West Bank. Excavations followed at Eshtemoa in 1968 and 1970, and later buildings on the site were removed. In 2024, the synagogue was the targeted in an arson attack. Local settler activists described it as an attempt to "erase the site's Jewish identity".

== See also ==
- Ancient synagogues in Palestine
- History of the Jews in Palestine
- List of oldest synagogues
