= Green Prophet =

Green Prophet is a news website that covers clean technology and sustainable news about the Middle East. It focuses mainly on topics related to the Middle East.

In 2012, the site was reaching almost 200,000 viewers per month. By 2015, more than 20 journalists and analysts reported for Green Prophet, following social issues related to the environment, in the Middle East-North Africa region.

== History ==
Green Prophet was founded in 2008 by Karin Kloosterman, an environmental activist from Canada, who moved to the Middle East. At first the website focused on environmental news from Israel. Shortly thereafter it began to publish news and feature articles about environmental topics throughout the Middle East, including eco-faith, solar and wind energy, organic living, sustainable housing, oil independence, science and health. Over the years Karin reports being one of the "biggest friends to the enemy states", because she works from Israel, a society with freedom of speech, she is able to write about the atrocities reported to her secretly from people in Iran, Iraq, Egypt, who might "disappear" for social, environmental action.

In 2009 Green Prophet hosted a blogger's conference for young Palestinians, connecting them to Jordanians and Israelis to help writers improve content and awareness about shared ecological issues. The event was organized by Daniella Cheslow, an American-Israeli, now an editor at Politico.

Green Prophet followed a social experiment in electricity use Masdar City in Abu Dhabi in 2010.

Notable writers include Daniella Cheslow (NPR, Washington Post), Arwa Aburawa (Al Jazeera).
