= Horvat Rimmon =

Archaeological site in Israel

- חורבת רימון (Hebrew) خربة أمّ الرمانين (Arabic)
- Hurvat Rimmon, Khirbet Umm er-Ramamin, Um er-Rumamin
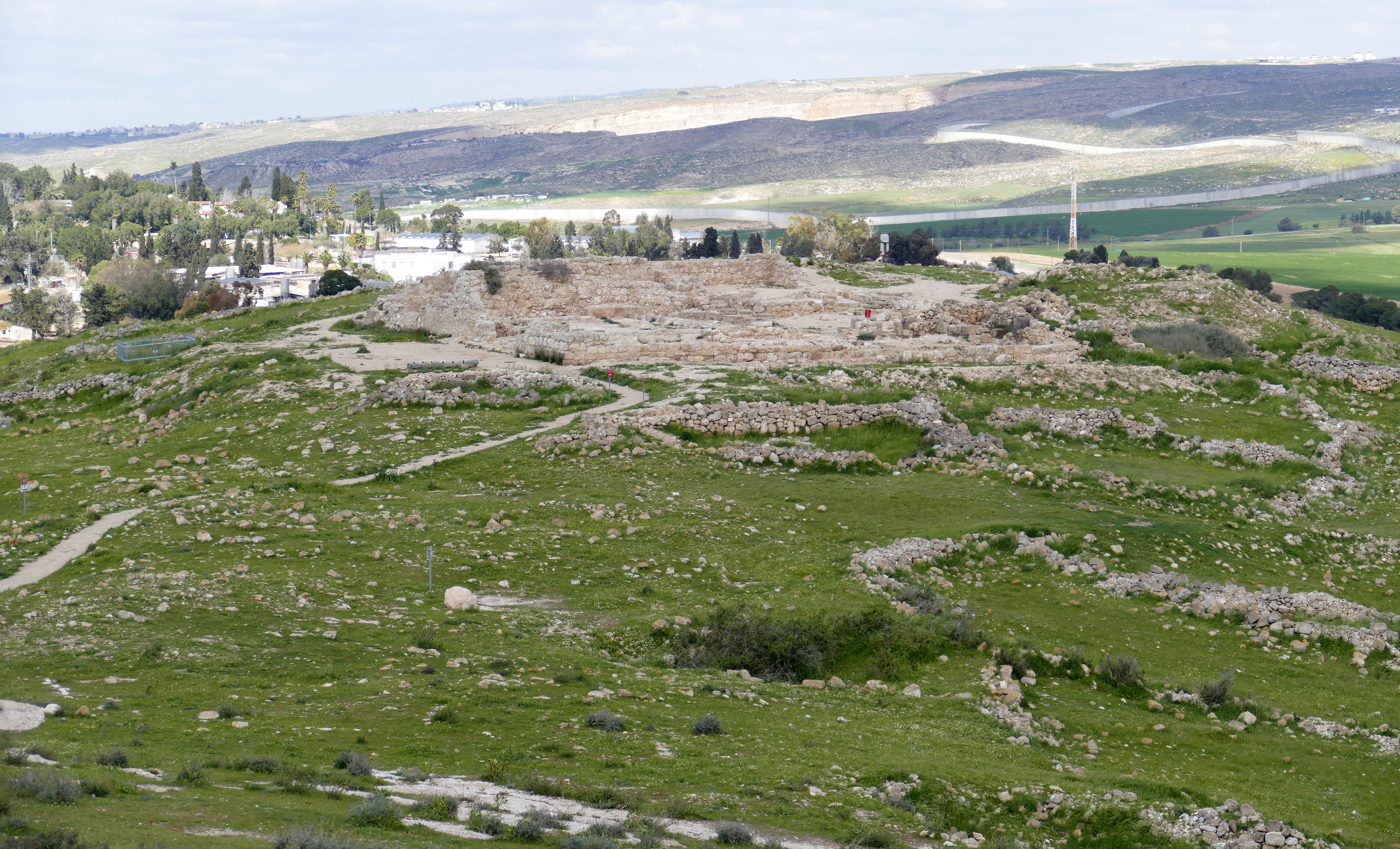
- Horvat Rimmon, showing the hilltop ruins of the settlement and synagogue

- Location within Israel
- 31°29′19″N 34°51′55″E
- Type: Settlement, synagogue, hiding complex, rock-cut tombs
- Periods: Roman, Byzantine and Early Islamic periods
- Cultures: Judaism (Second Temple and Rabbinic-era)
- Associated with: Jews
- Location: Lahav, Israel
- Region: Judaean Lowlands (Shephelah)

History
- Built: Late 3rd century CE
- Abandoned: Mid-7th century CE

Site notes
- Height: 470 m (1,540 ft)
- Excavation dates: 1976; 1978–1981; 1984
- Archaeologists: Amos Kloner, David Alon, Pau Figueras
- Condition: In ruins

Horvat Rimmon (Hebrew: חורבת רימון, lit. 'ruin of the pomegranate'), or simply Rimmon, alternatively Khirbet Umm er-Ramanin (Arabic: خربة أمّ الرمانين, lit. 'ruin of the mother of the pomegranates'), is an archaeological site in the southern Judean Lowlands in Israel. Located on a low hill about 500 metres (1,600 ft) south of Lahav, it preserves the remains of a Jewish village occupied from the late Second Temple period into the early Islamic era. The site is home to a large synagogue complex, which went through three main construction phases from the 3rd to the 7th century CE, as well as a cemetery of rock-cut tombs, a subterranean hiding complex, a mikveh (ritual bath) and domestic structures, and several late Roman and Byzantine coin hoards.

The site is commonly identified with En-Rimmon (Eremmon/Rimmon), a sizeable Jewish village mentioned in the Hebrew Bible, by Eusebius, in rabbinic literature, and in a document from the Bar Kokhba revolt. The biblical settlement itself is usually placed at nearby Tel Halif, and the name Rimmon appears to have shifted to the site in later centuries.

Excavations have uncovered a synagogue paved with flagstones decorated with rosettes and a menorah. They also revealed a funerary inscription reading "Jacob son of Rabbi", as well as a ceramic amulet inscribed with a love charm whose formula and "magic signs" closely parallel medieval Jewish texts.

== Geography ==
Rimmon is located in the southern Judean Lowlands (Shephelah), approximately 28 km southwest of Hebron and 54 km south-southwest of Jerusalem, on a natural hill rising to 470 m (1,540 ft) above sea level. (Note: The site has also been described as lying in the northeastern Negev.) In late antiquity, this area formed part of the territory of Beit Guvrin–Eleutheropolis. The contemporary Kibbutz Lahav is situated about 500 m to the north.

== Identification ==
While early explorers identified the ruin with the biblical town of En-Rimmon (Nehemiah 11:20, Joshua 15:32), the absence of Iron Age and Persian-period remains had led most scholars to relocate the biblical-era town to Tel Halif, about 500 m to the north, where Iron Age and Persian-period remains indicative of Israelite presence have been found. The name Rimmon appears to have shifted from Tel Halif to Horvat Rimmon during the later Second Temple period.

Eusebius of Caesarea, a Church historian and theologian (known as one of the Church Fathers) active in the late 3rd and early 4th centuries CE, places En-Rimmon sixteen Roman miles from Eleutheropolis, describing it as a "very large village of Jews ... in the Daroma," a late antique term for the southern Hebron Hills. The site is also mentioned in rabbinic texts, including the Tosefta and Genesis Rabbah, and appears once in the Muraba'at papyri, texts dating from the Bar Kokhba revolt found in caves of Wadi Murabba'at in the Judaean Desert.

In the Byzantine era, Rimmon was situated among several Christian villages, including Thella at Tel Halif and Khirbet Abu Hoff, where churches have been excavated.

== Synagogue ==
The synagogue occupies the hill's summit and underwent three major construction phases, built atop earlier Second Temple-period structures. These phases are conventionally termed Synagogue I, II, and III, and correlate to Strata IV–VII of the settlement.

Phase I of the synagogue was probably built in the late 3rd century CE. The layout is poorly preserved due to later construction. Features include a crushed limestone floor, a rectangular plastered niche high in the north wall (possibly for Torah storage), and an eastern stylobate with three column pedestals, suggesting a broad-house plan with an eastern portico. Fragmentary architectural decorations (floral and geometric) may belong to this phase as well, though this remains uncertain.

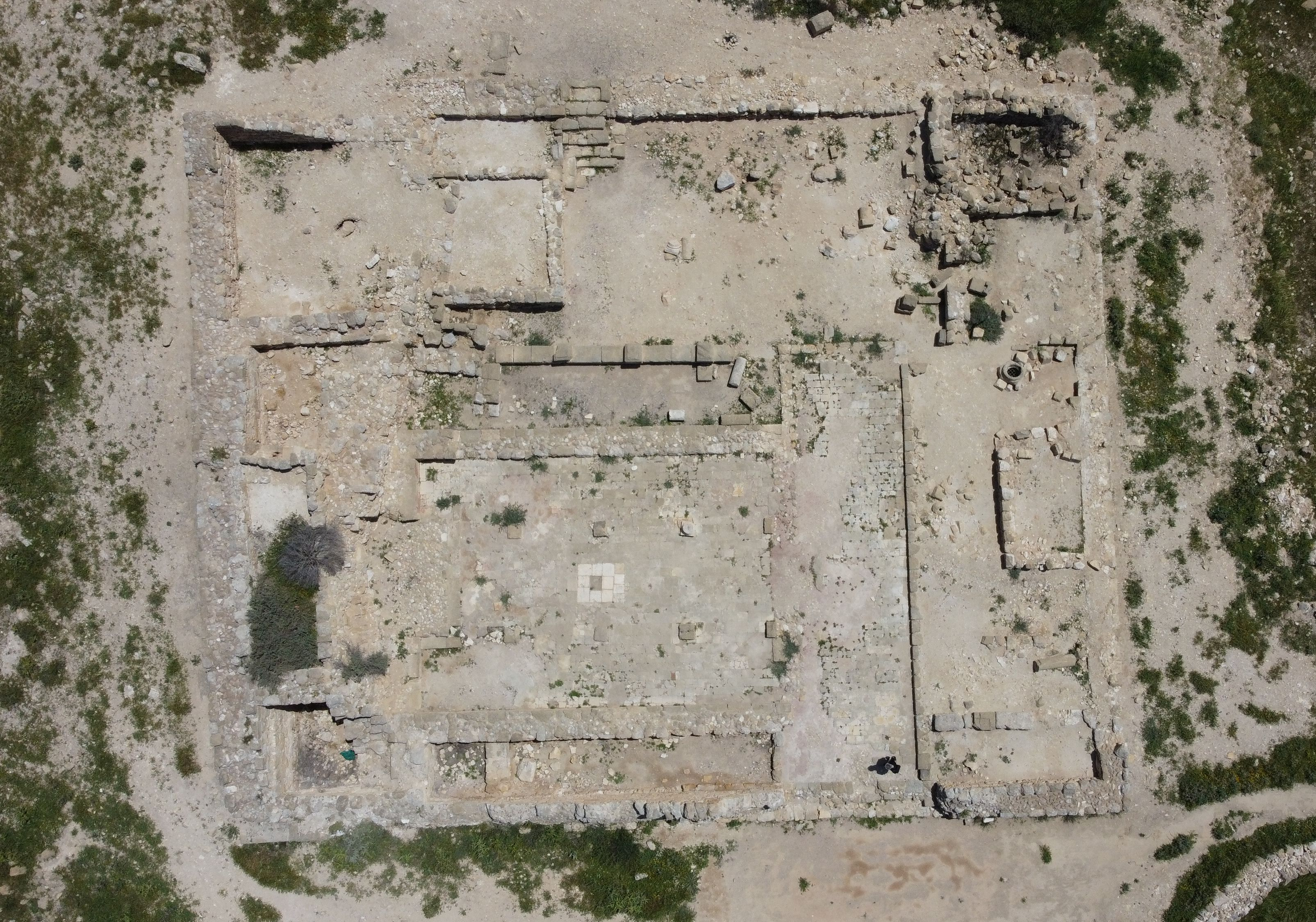
Aerial view of the synagogue complex at Horvat Rimmon

Phase II involved a substantial redesign that created a basilical synagogue, which contained a hall measuring 13.5 × 9.5 m, with a nave and two aisles. A triportal southern façade fronted by a roofed narthex, a long western room parallel to the main hall, and a plastered floor were all part of the new design. Pillars were added later, during a renovation. The western room was later filled with various artifacts: bronze, glass, stone, lamps, roof tiles, and possibly fragments of a chancel screen.

A final major renovation, Phase III of the synagogue, introduced flagstone pavement laid in cement bedding and a central 3 × 3 m "carpet" of pavers engraved with five rosettes and a seven-branched menorah. Additionally, a bema was built along the north wall, measuring 5 × 1.7 m, likely supporting a wooden Torah shrine. Coins of the Byzantine Emperor Phocas (r. 602–610 CE) found beneath the pavement indicate construction no earlier than the early 7th century CE. The synagogue was likely abandoned in the mid-7th century CE, followed by domestic reuse, as indicated by the presence of a tabun oven and ash layers.

== Coin hoards ==
Three coin hoards were recovered from the western room, seemingly buried during the synagogue's last phase. Two were gold hoards (12 and 35 coins), ranging from Valentinian I (r. 364–375 CE) to Anastasius I Dicorus (r. 491–518 CE). One bronze hoard included 64 coins, ranging from the 3rd to the 5th centuries CE. These were discovered inside sealed vessels, inverted and deliberately burned.

== Love amulet ==
One of the most significant discoveries from the Horvat Rimmon synagogue complex is a group of five inscribed potsherds dated to the 5th–6th century CE that once formed a trapezoidal ceramic amulet, intended to arouse love in a particular person. The inscription, cut into the clay while it was still moist, preserves substantial portions of a love incantation in Aramaic. The physical condition of the object suggests it was meant to be heated or burned, an idea reinforced by the wording of the adjuration, which compares the burning of the clay with the desired emotional "kindling" in the spell's target. The preserved lines request that the heart, mind, and inner organs of the named person be stirred so that they will comply with the petitioner's wishes.

Although only part of the text survives, it is clear that the spell originally began with a sequence of six magical or angelic names, each enclosed within a circular frame similar to a cartouche. These are followed by an invocation calling upon "holy and mighty" angels to ignite passion in a named individual. This name is only partially preserved and has been reconstructed as R[achel, daughter of Mar]in (the portion in brackets representing a scholarly restoration of the damaged text). The name of the petitioner remains unknown. The text concludes with magical characters resembling Paleo-Hebrew and Greek letters.

Original Aramaic

הראות אתבאות קולהון

ספתון סוסגר [ ]

אתון מלאכיה קד[ישיה ותקיפיה(?)]

[משבע אנה] יתכון במ[ה דיקד הספה]

[הדין כן] יקוד לבה דר[...ברה

(ברתה?)]

[דמר]ין בתרי אנה יו[...תהפכו]

[לבה והו]נה (?) [ו]כוליתה ו[י/תעבר]

ציבירוני בהד[ ]מוד [ ]

(?????) [ ]

Translation:
Translation to English

Hera'ot, 'Etba'ot, Qolhon

Sephaton, Sosgar, [ ]

You ho[ly and mighty(?)] angels

[I adjure] you, just as [this sherd]

[burns, so shall] burn the heart of

R[. . . son (daughter?)]

[of Mar]ian after me, I . .[. . . . and you should turn]

[his/her heart and mi]nd (?) and kidney, so [that he/she will do]

my desire in this [ ]

(?????) [ ]

The charm's wording and magical characters match nearly identical recipes found in medieval Jewish manuscripts from the Cairo Geniza. Its archaeological discovery, which allows the amulet to be dated to the 5th–6th century CE, shows that these formulas were already in use centuries before their medieval attestation in Egypt. Through this finding, scholars of Jewish magic have been able to trace continuity in Jewish magical tradition from the Byzantine period, through the Middle Ages, and even into the 20th century, when parallels were still observed among Jews in Iraq (as attested by archaeologist Reginald Campbell Thompson in his study of folklore in Mosul). According to Gideon Bohak, this continuity indicates that the Horvat Rimmon amulet was not composed from memory, but reflects the "wide circulation of such magical recipe books in late antique Palestine and probably in Egypt as well."

== Burial caves and subterranean complexes ==
Rock-cut tombs at Horvat Rimmon are cut into the caliche-and-chalk slopes southeast of the settlement, forming a cemetery spread along a horseshoe-shaped hillside. The geology, with a hard caliche cap over soft Eocene chalk, allowed the quarrying of numerous subterranean burial caves with forecourts and small, easily sealed entrances.

Seven caves were excavated; they exhibit a range of burial forms: kokhim-type caves characteristic of the late Second Temple period (2nd century BCE – 1st century CE); chambers with arcosolia, loculi, standing pits and multiple burial troughs typical of the late Roman period (2nd–4th century CE); and later caves with simple, sunk-in graves typical of the Byzantine-era (5th–6th century CE). Many caves contained stone ossuaries, usually of soft limestone, often crudely made, sometimes decorated with geometric designs, and fitted with gabled lids bearing acroteria. The lid of one of the ossuaries is inscribed with the name "Jacob son of Rabbi" (Hebrew: יעקב בן רבי).

A system of subterranean tunnels and caves excavated at the site is attributed to the Bar Kokhba revolt (132–136 CE), based on typological parallels to other Bar Kokhba hiding complexes in the Judean Lowlands and the Hebron Hills.

== Research history ==
Major excavations were conducted by archaeologist Amos Kloner in 1978–1981, revealing the synagogue and its associated architectural phases. Although a final report has not yet been published, multiple preliminary reports outline the building's stratigraphy and finds. Further excavations, led by Federico Kobrin on behalf of the Israel Antiquities Authority, took place in 2016. In 1976 and 1984, another archaeologist, David Alon, carried out excavations at seven burial caves southwest of the synagogue, with evidence of intermittent use from the late Second Temple period to the 6th century CE; these excavations also unveiled the inscribed ossuary.

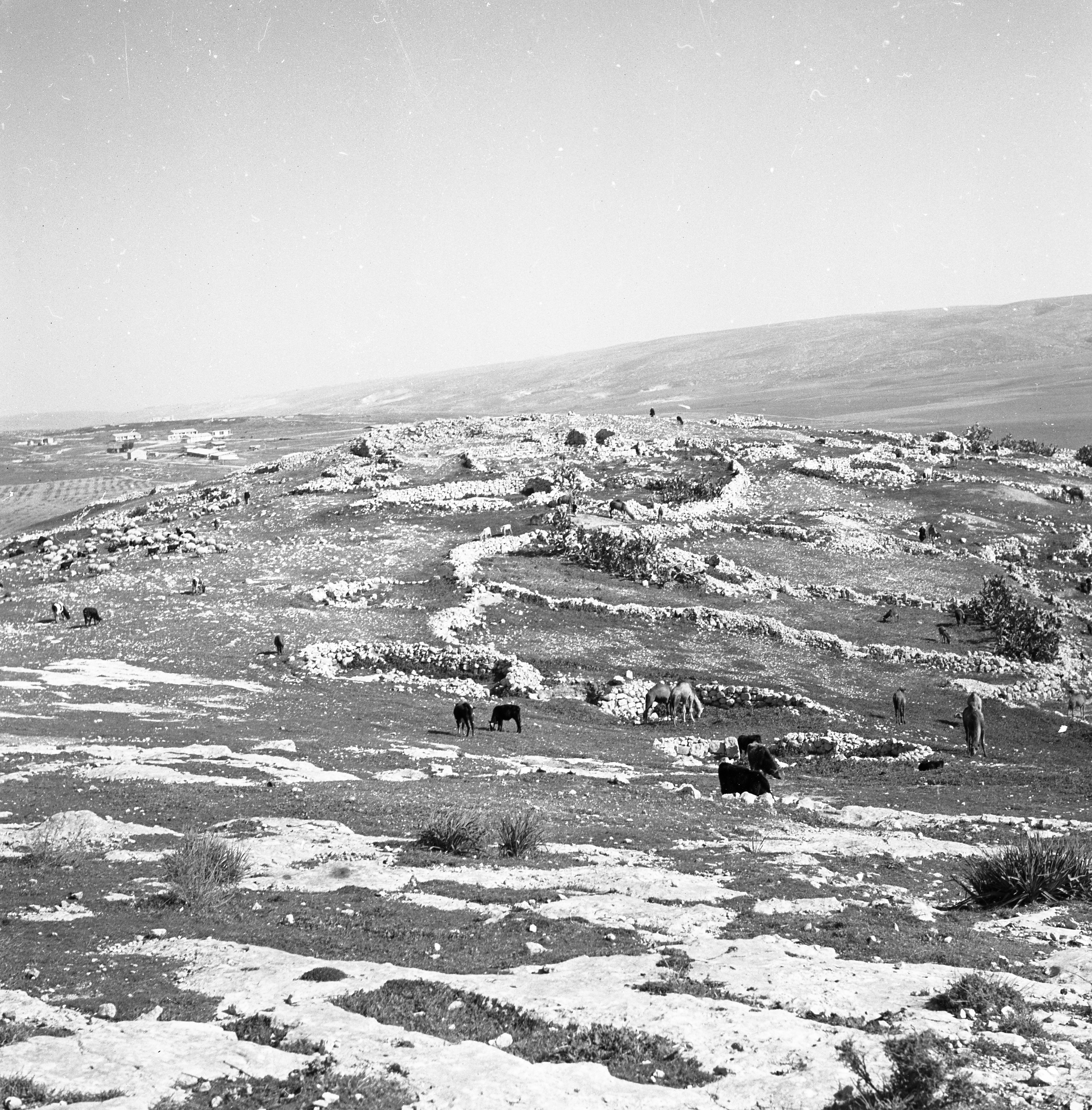
Horvat Rimmon in 1956

In the early 1990s, Pau Figueras excavated a subterranean complex attributed to the Bar Kokhba revolt. In the mid-2000s, the Israel Antiquities Authority carried out a limited excavation uncovering a mikveh (Jewish ritual bath), domestic structures, and additional walls.

== See also ==
- Ancient Jewish magic
- Daroma
- Horvat 'Anim
