= Eshtemoa =

Town of ancient Judea

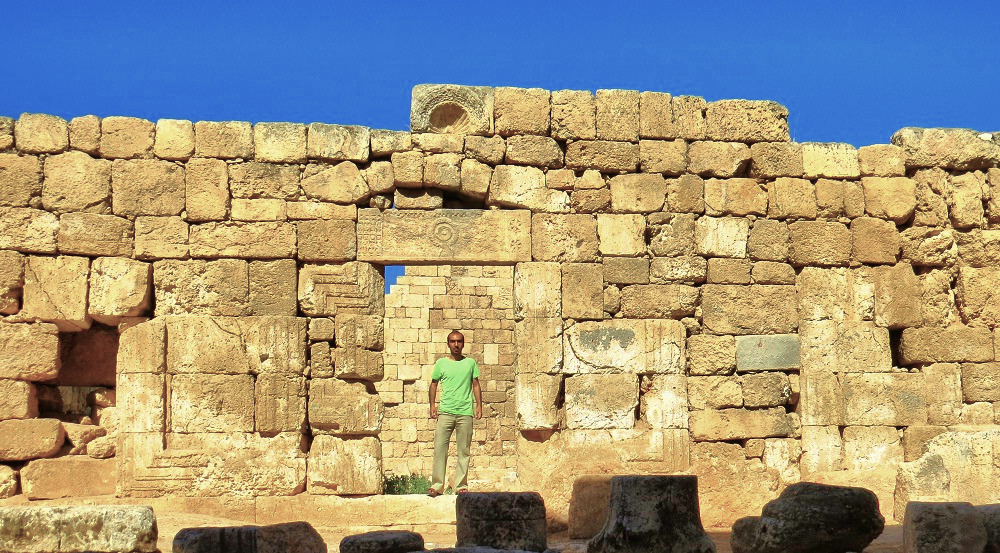
Eshtemoa synagogue, an ancient Jewish synagogue found a as-Samu' and dated to the 4th–5th century CE

Eshtemoa (Hebrew: אֶשְׁתְּמֹעַ), also transcribed Ashtemoe, Eshtemo, and Esthama (Ancient Greek: Ἐσθαμά, Ἐσθεμά), was an ancient city in the Judaean Mountains, specifically in the southern Hebron Hills, mentioned several times in the Hebrew Bible. It is identified with the modern site of As-Samu'.

The name also appears as that of two individuals in the First Book of Chronicles.

== Etymology ==
The name Eshtemoa is derived from the root שמע (shamaʿ, "hear"), and has been interpreted as meaning "obedience" or "place where prayer is heard".

== Eshtemoa, Judah ==
Eshtemoa was an ancient city in the Judaean Mountains, mentioned several times in the Hebrew Bible. According to the Book of Joshua, It was a Levitical city belonging to the Tribe of Judah, which was allotted, with the common land round it, to the priests (Joshua 15:50, 21:14). It is later mentioned in the 1 Samuel as one of the cities that received spoils following king David's victory over the Amalekites at Ziklag. It was one of the places frequented by King David as a fugitive (1 Samuel 30: 26–28).

In the 4th-century CE, Eshtemoa was described by Eusebius in his Onomasticon as a large Jewish village. The Jerusalem Talmud mentions Eshtemoa as the place of residence of an amora (scholar) who dwelt in the town during the 4th century by the name of Hasa of Eshtemoa.

Eshtemoa is identified with as-Samu, a village about 3½ miles east of Socoh, and about 9 miles south of Hebron, around which there are ancient remains of the ruined city.

=== Findings ===
In 1934, the remains of an ancient Jewish synagogue, now known as the Eshtemoa synagogue, were unearthed at as-Samu'. The synagogue is dated to around the 4th–5th century CE. Four seven-branched menorahs were discovered carved onto door lintels and one of them is displayed in Jerusalem's Rockefeller Museum.

In 1971, five pottery jars dated to the 9th-8th centuries BCE were found in as-Samu', bearing inscriptions written in the Paleo-Hebrew alphabet. These jars contained one of the largest silver hoards ever found in Israel and the Palestinian Territories.

== People ==
Eshtemoa is mentioned twice in the Hebrew Bible as a name of a person:

- A son of Ishbah or maybe a town inhabited by Ishbah's descendants. (1 Chronicles 4:17)
- A descendant of Bithiah princess of Egypt and Mered (1 Chronicles 4:19)

== See also ==
- Eshtemoa synagogue, the remains of an ancient Jewish synagogue dating from around the 4th–5th century CE
- Mitzpe Eshtemoa (Eshtemoa look-out), an Israeli settlement outpost in the West Bank
- Cities in the Book of Joshua
