= Kloosterman =

Kloosterman is a Dutch surname. Notable people with the surname include:

- Hendrik Kloosterman (1900–1968), Dutch mathematician
  - Kloosterman sum
- Karin Kloosterman, Canadian entrepreneur, biologist, and journalist
- Maarten Kloosterman (born 1942), Dutch Olympic rower

== See also ==
- Klostermann
