= Love magic =

Type of magic focused on relationships

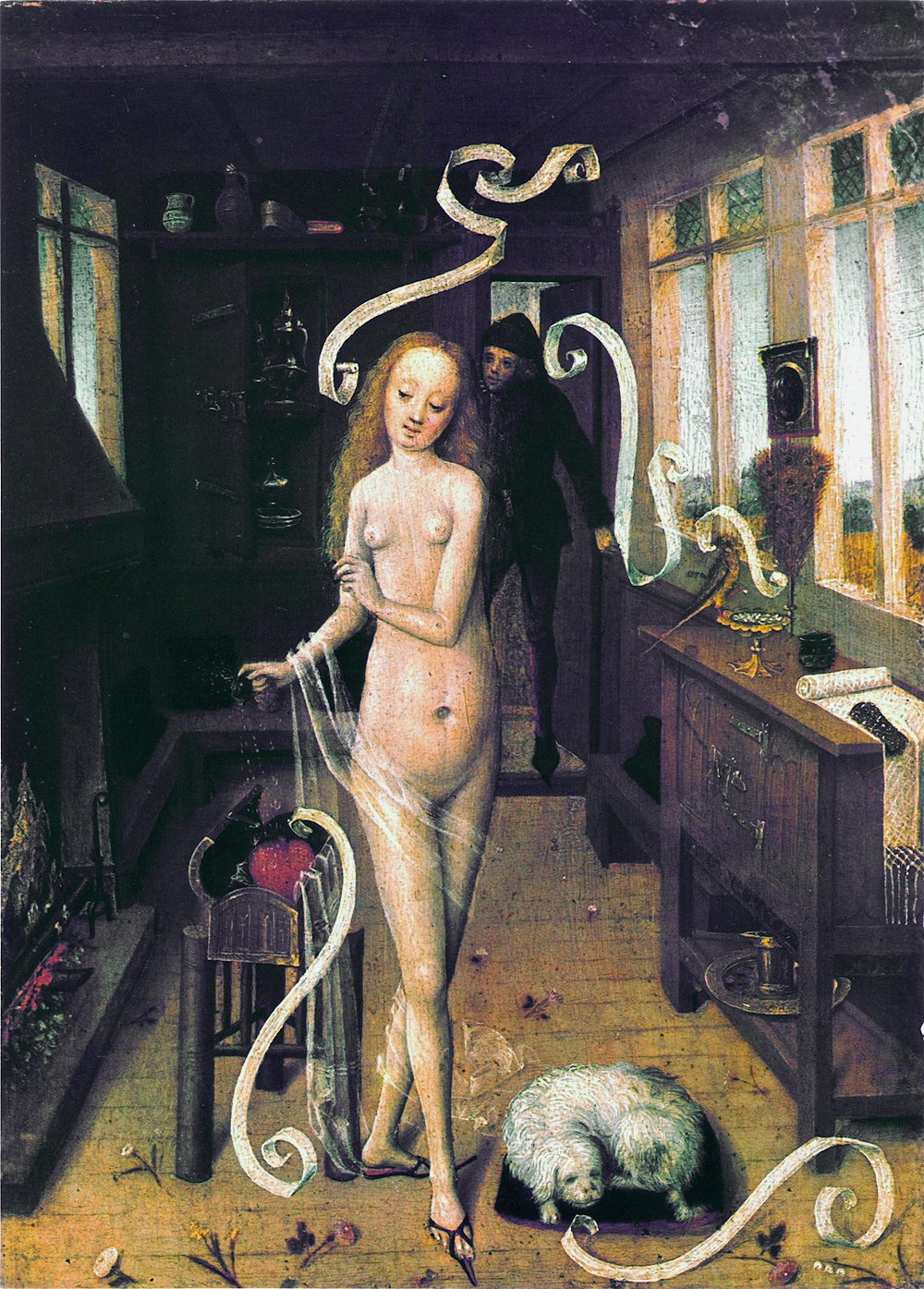
Painting from the lower Rhine, 1470–1480, showing love magic, collection of Museum der bildenden Künste

Love magic is a type of magic that has existed or currently exists in many cultures around the world as a part of folk beliefs, both by clergy and laity of nearly every religion. Historically, it is attested on cuneiform tablets from Mesopotamia, in ancient Egyptian texts and later Coptic texts, in the Greco-Roman world, in Syriac texts, in the European Middle Ages and early modern period, and among all Jewish groups who co-existed with these groups.

The exact definition of what constitutes 'love magic' can be difficult to establish and will vary from scholar to scholar, but a common theme shared by many is the use of magic to start, preserve, or break up a relationship of some type whether for purely sexual or romantic purposes or both. The tools and methods used in its practice do not significantly differ from the way other forms of magic are practiced and include spoken and written spells and incantations, dolls, talismans, amulets, potions, and rituals.

As most surviving sources concern love between men and women, there is a strong heterosexual bias when discussing these sources, though there are a few examples known to concern love between both two men and two women, such as Greek curse tablets. Love magic motifs appear in literature and art and in the mythologies of many cultures. It is less likely to occur in modern fiction, except in fantasy fiction (like Harry Potter), though even then it is not common and may be portrayed as negative.

Christians in late antiquity were among others that practiced magic and, more specifically, love spells. Despite the controversy in Christian communities, it was still a common practice. These spells are influenced and derived of pagan traditions. The goal of these spells was to attract the desired sex, and they were used mainly by men but also by women and same-sex communities. Even though Christians were using love spells, this was still very problematic and angered many officials of the church as it was viewed as contrary to official scripture.

== Ancient love magic in cuneiform ==
Early examples of love magic can be found in the ancient Near East, dating to ca. 2200 BCE. Cuneiform tablets preserving rituals of erotic magic have been uncovered at Tell Inghara and Isin (present-day Iraq). Similar rituals are attested in Ancient Egypt, for instance, on an ostracon dated to the twentieth dynasty (twelfth-eleventh centuries BCE). Love spells and rituals have been found among the Sumerians, Akkadians, and Babylonians, and formulae used in them can be found in later time periods in the Near East among other peoples.

== Hellenistic love magic ==
Spells of erotic attraction and compulsion are found within the syncretic magic tradition of Hellenistic Greece, which incorporated Egyptian and Hebraic elements as documented in texts such as the Greek Magical Papyri and archaeologically on amulets and other artifacts dating from the 2nd century BC (and sometimes earlier) to the late 3rd century A.D. These magical practices continued to influence private rituals in Gaul among Celtic peoples, in Roman Britain, and among Germanic peoples.

Christopher A. Faraone, a University of Chicago Classics professor specializing in texts and practices pertaining to magic, distinguishes between the magic of eros, as practiced by men, and the magic of philia, practiced by women. These two types of spells can be connected directly to the gender roles of men and women in Ancient Greece. Women used philia spells because they were more dependent on their husbands. In marriage, women were powerless as men were legally permitted to divorce. As a result, many used any means necessary to maintain their marriages which meant more interest in affection producing spells. Philia magic was used by women to keep their male companion at bay and faithful. Eros spells were mainly practiced by men and a small selection of women, like prostitutes, and were used to imbue lust into the victim. However, Faraone himself also states that eros magic can be thought of as aggressive magic and philia as non-aggressive.

While some scholars use Faraone's model, like Catherine Rider though she modifies it slightly, it has been questioned by other scholars, such as Irene Salvo, who points out the exceptions to his classification and finds them to be more elucidating of how love magic in Hellenistic Greece actually worked. She points out there were men who used philia spells and women who used eros spells who were not prostitutes or who generally appear to have lived like men.

== Love magic in the Renaissance ==
Magic was expensive and was believed to cause severe damage to the caster; therefore, it was not taken lightly. Thus, spells were not just cast upon just anyone in the Renaissance, but on those unions that held special importance. Men and women of status and favor were more often the targets of love magic. Economic or social class restrictions would often inhibit a marriage and love magic was seen as a way to break those barriers, leading to social advancement.

While the spells were supposed to be kept secret, very rarely were they successful in this. However, if the victim realized that a spell was being cast upon them, believing in magic themselves, they would often submit to the believed enchantment, adding effectiveness to love magic.

With the dominance of Christianity and Catholicism in Europe during the Renaissance, elements of Christianity seeped its way into the magic rituals themselves. Often, clay dolls or written spell scrolls would be hidden in the altar at churches, or holy candles would be lit in the rituals. The Host from a Catholic Mass would sometimes be taken and used in rituals to gain the desired result. Thus, love magic within the Renaissance period was both Christian and pagan.

== Women in love magic ==
According to historian Guido Ruggiero, love magic is seen as drawing "…heavily upon what was perceived as quintessentially feminine: fertility, birth, menstruation (seen as closely related to both fertility and birth), and a woman’s ‘nature’ or ‘shameful parts,’ that is, genitals". This feminine attribute is reflected within the literature such as the Malleus Maleficarum and in the trials of the Holy Office in which most of the cases brought before the council were women accused of bewitching men. This illustrates the common stereotype that men did not perform magic. According to historians Guido Ruggiero and Christopher A. Faraone, love magic was often associated with prostitutes and courtesans, but this has been questioned by other scholars such as Catherine Rider who, in a study of late medieval Western European pastoral manuals and exempla, especially English, argues this was a development that happened around the time of the early modern witch trials and may have been influenced by the fact that the women who were most often tried for love magic were women of ill-repute, in illicit relationships, or both. In the early Middle Ages, it was married women who were solely portrayed as practicing love magic on their husbands.

In the Early Middle Ages, there is some evidence that women were considered more likely to be practitioners of love magic. For instance, in the works of Regino of Prüm, Burchard of Worms, and Hincmar the practitioners of love magic are usually gendered as female. However, in pastoral manuals and exempla from this same time period, the practitioners are often not gendered at all or men are primarily singled out.

How modern scholars interpret how medieval and early modern Europeans viewed women, witches, and magic has traditionally been heavily influenced by the 1487 misogynistic anti-witchcraft treatise Malleus Maleficarum written by Heinrich Kramer. In the opening section of this text, it discusses the sexuality of women in relation to the devil. Heinrich Kramer wrote within his book that, "All witchcraft comes from carnal lust, which in women is insatiable." But as Rider and others have noted, this may reflect the opinions of one man in one region and was not widespread in Europe as a whole.

Matthew W. Dickie, a prominent magic scholar, argues that men were the main casters of love magic. Demographically, they suggest that the largest age group that practiced love magic were younger men targeting young, unobtainable women. There are a variety of explanations for why the literary world contrasted reality in this area, but a common interpretation is that men were trying to subtract themselves from association.

== In literature and art ==
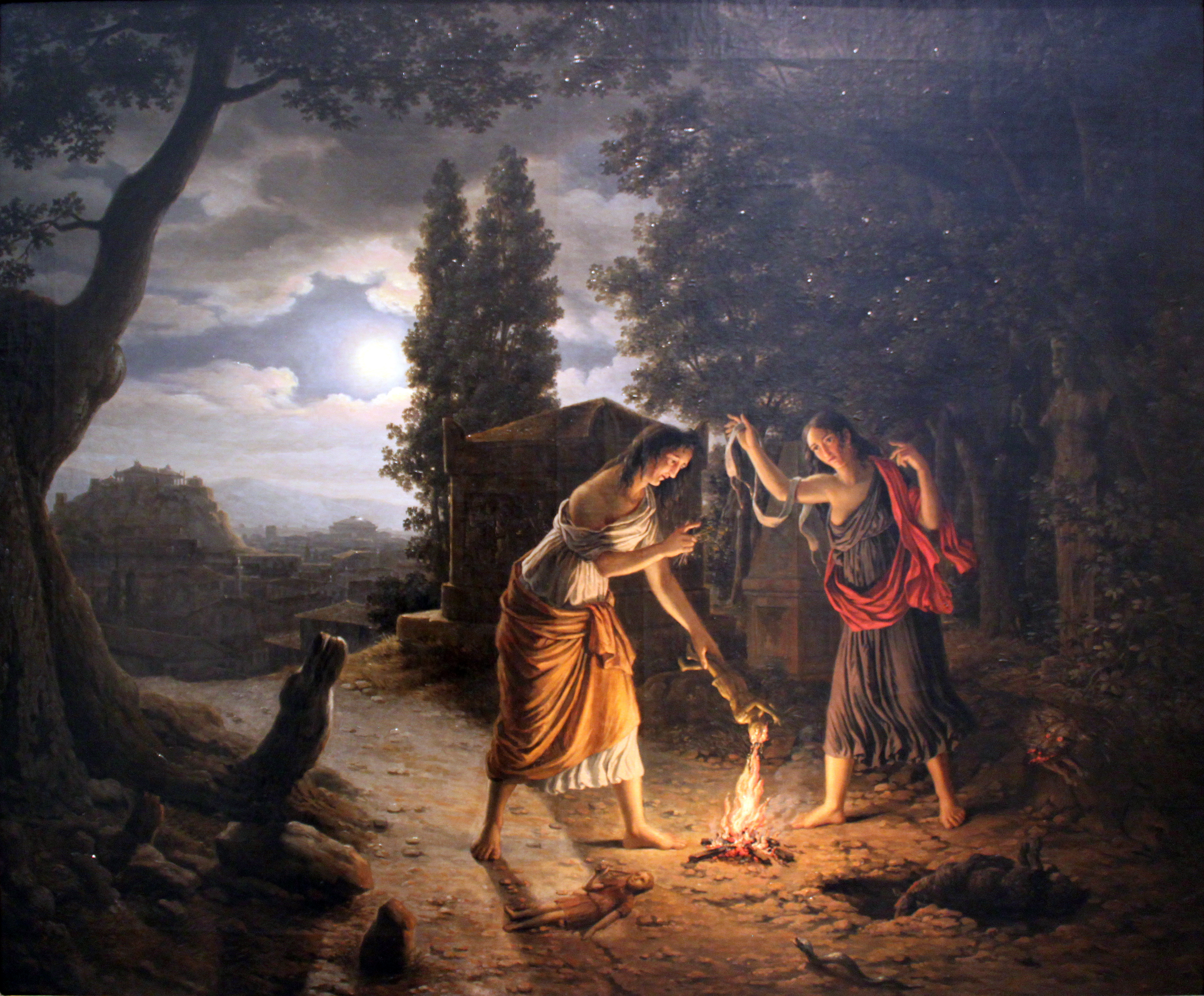
Roman love spell, by Johann Erdmann Hummel, 1848

In literature and art, the motif of a genuine love spell used to create or break up a relationship, typically for the benefit of one of the protagonists, is somewhat common, particularly in older literature and art, and sometimes causes tragic setbacks and complications for said protagonists. One of the earliest manifestations of the theme in the Western world is the myth of the hero Heracles' death by his last wife Deianeira, who was tricked by a centaur into killing him with a poisoned shirt he said would reignite his love for her again should she feel his love ever fade. A famous treatment of the subject is in Richard Wagner's 1865 opera Tristan and Isolde, which in turn goes back to the same epic by Gottfried von Strassburg. Other examples of the use of love magic motif are Donizetti's 1832 opera The Elixir of Love (L'Elisir d'amore) and Manuel de Falla's 1915 ballet El amor brujo (The Magic of Love). Its use can also be found in modern fantasy fiction like the Harry Potter series, with the most prominent use of love magic in the series being Merope Gaunt forcing Tom Riddle Sr. to love her by utilizing some form of love magic when he does not love her of his own volition. This results in the birth of the main villain of the series, Tom Riddle. The use of love magic is notable in the narrative because he cannot understand the concept of love due to his loveless conception and consequent orphaning, a result of the love magic being used. The magic is portrayed as a desperate and immoral act, and love potions have a reputation in the fandom as being the magical equivalent of date rape drugs ("roofies").

== Love spells in Christianity ==
While church teachings often condemn the use of magic or spells, this was not always the case; newer studies have revealed that in certain contexts, Christians did use spells and amulets. The most common form of magic used was love spells. These spells were mainly found in Egypt or within Roman culture during late antiquity.

Christian magic often developed in response to pagan magic. This was to counteract the widespread influence of pagan magic. However, this influence would bleed into Christian spells, including the use of papyri and amulets.

Practitioners of Christian magic, despite also using magic, were very against pagan magic, claiming that it was demonic. This is primarily due to the source the spells were coming from. In Christian spells, they often cite church teachings, scriptures, and Christian Gods and even had spells that called for the use of blessed oil.

One of the most common Christian love spells was erotic or sexual spells. These erotic spells typically had two purposes. The first was to gain the attraction of an unattainable woman and to control that woman, specifically to control her sexual desire to ensure she would only find the spell caster desirable. The second use was to secure a marriage that would benefit the user in the social hierarchy.

Originally, it was believed that women were the sole practitioners of erotic spells. However, this belief is rooted in the fact that most authors from this time period were men, meaning women’s narratives are absent. Male authors often wrote women as magic practitioners to distance men from it since it was very problematic and controversial in the Christian community.

Erotic and love spells were also found in early Christian communities within same-sex relationships. Similar to heterosexual spells, they were used to control or influence the desired person’s attraction. Same-sex love spells commissioned by women are harder to analyze due to there being few records written by women, making it difficult to completely understand their motives for these spells. However, there is evidence to support that, at the very least, these women were actively willing to engage in sexual relations with other women. However, when this was discovered, women were heavily persecuted and criticized as this action was not acceptable behavior of women.

== Love spells in Judaism ==
Love magic is also attested in ancient Jewish society. An early example is an amulet discovered in the synagogue complex at Horvat Rimmon in the northern Negev in Israel. The amulet is composed of five pottery sherds, dated by stratigraphy to the 5th–6th century CE, and bears an Aramaic love incantation inscribed while the clay was still moist. The text begins with angelic names, each enclosed in a circular frame, and continues with an adjuration calling upon angels to inflame the heart, mind, and inner organs of a named individual, reconstructed by scholars as R[achel, daughter of Mar]in. The object was likely intended to be heated or burned as part of its ritual use.

== See also ==
- Sex magic
- Love Magic, 1981 studio album by L.T.D.
- "Lovely Magic", 2003 single by Yukari Tamura
- "Love Magic Fever" (Japanese: ラブマジック♡フィーバー, romanized: Rabu Majikku Fībā), 2009 single by Puyo Puyo Idoling!!!
- Made to Love Magic, 2004 compilation album by Nick Drake
- Magic of Love (disambiguation)

=== Other titles with "love" and "magic" ===
- Love and Other Magic, book 2 in the Guinevere Jones series by Elizabeth Stewart
- Love in Magic (Korean: 연애술사, romanized: Yeonaesulsa), 2005 South Korean romantic comedy film
- Love Is Magic, 2018 studio album by John Grant
- "Love Sex Magic", 2009 song by Ciara featuring Justin Timberlake
- "Magic of Love" (song), 2013 song by Perfume
- Magic Love & Dreams EP, 2009 recording by Magic Wands
- "The Magic Love", 1989 The Super Mario Bros. Super Show! segment
