= Magic of Love =

Magic of Love may refer to

- Magic of Love (album), a 1999 album by Zhao Wei
- "Magic of Love" (song), a 2013 song by Perfume
- "Magic of Love", a 1960 song by Johnny Kidd & the Pirates
- "Magic of Love", a song by Big Brother and the Holding Company from Farewell Song
- "Magic of Love", a 1986 song by Sheena Easton
- "Magic of Love", a 1999 song by Taiyō to Ciscomoon
- The Magic of Love, 1977 novel by Barbara Cartland
- "Pyar Ka Jadu" (lit. 'Magic of Love'), a song by Zoheb Hassan from the 1983 album Young Tarang

== See also ==
- Love magic
