= Hasa of Eshtemoa =

Hasa of Eshtemoa (Hebrew: חסא דאשתמוע) was an amora active in Eshtemoa in the Land of Israel during the end of the 3rd-century or beginning of the 4th-century CE. He is mentioned once in the Jerusalem Talmud as being visited by Rav Yasa of Tiberias.
