= Karin Kloosterman =

Karin Kloosterman is a Canadian serial entrepreneur, biologist, journalist, environmental publisher, founder of Green Prophet, co-founder of Flux IoT, social entrepreneur and futurist.

== Biography ==
Kloosterman was born in Canada to Dutch and Scottish immigrants.

She studied zoology at the University of Toronto, and is the founder and editor of the sustainable news site Green Prophet.

Kloosterman first worked at CABI finding natural alternatives to conventional pesticides. During that time and before she published several papers on tracking forest health using indicator species such as amphibians and the importance of old-growth forests for forest health. She left science because she said it didn't leave space for intuition and even though research institutions welcomed women the entire approach of biology was masculine and based on antiquated constructs that didn't leave room for intuition. She travelled to the Middle East and established the blog Green Prophet about environmental issues which affected Israel, having identified what she described as a "huge black hole" in reporting on such issues in the country. She then decided she didn't need to limit it to just Israel, and begun covering environmental issues throughout the Middle East.

Kloosterman is co-founder of the Internet of things company Flux IoT, based in New York City. She also organized Israel's first international cannabis technologies conference, CannaTech, in 2015 and founded Mars Farm Odyssey to create non-NASA approved solutions for farming in outer space.

Flux IoT, developing a grow robot called Eddy, was hailed by Bloomberg News in 2017 as "likely to disrupt" the food system. In 2017, her alliance Mars Farm was featured in Fast Company. In 2019, Kloosterman was interviewed about her plan for a device that will grow cannabis on Mars.

She has written articles for publications such as Canada's National Post, Techcrunch, The Jerusalem Post, HuffPost, TreeHugger, and Pittsburgh Jewish Chronicle.

== Personal life ==
She lives in a forest in Canada with her two children and husband.

== See also ==
- Space farming
