= Beit Guvrin =

Beit Guvrin may refer to a succession of settlements and their archaeological remains, in proper chronology: Maresha, later Marisa; and Beth Gabra (also Baetogabra, Betogabris, orBetogabri), later Eleutheropolis, Beit/Bait/Bayt Jibrin, Bethgibelin, and currently Beit Guvrin National Park and Kibbutz Beit Guvrin.

- Beit Jibrin, a Palestinian village depopulated in 1948, at the site of Idumean and Judean Beth Gabra, and Roman and Byzantine Eleutheropolis
- Beit Guvrin-Maresha National Park, encompassing the ruins of Bayt Jibrin / Eleutheropolis, as well as Maresha, a city from the Iron Age to the Early Roman period
- Beit Guvrin, Israel, a kibbutz founded in 1949
