= As-Samu =

Ancient biblical and modern settlement in Palestine

As Samu' السموع (Arabic)
- Municipality type B

Arabic transcription(s)
  - Arabic: السموع
  - Latin: es Samu' (official); Samua (unofficial)
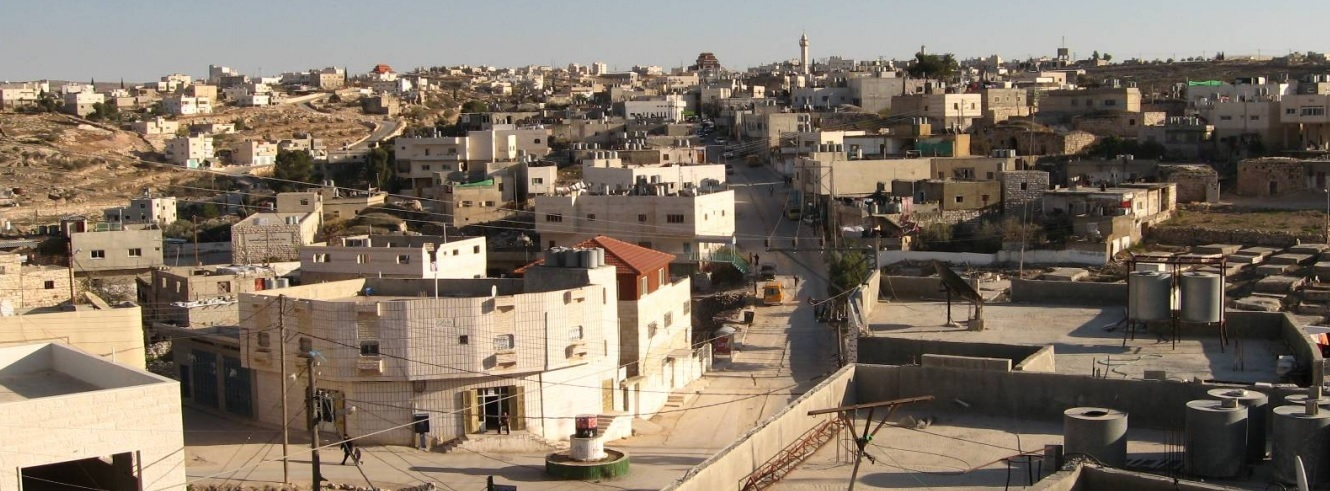
- As-Samu, 2007

- Location of As Samu' within Palestine
- Coordinates: 31°24′03″N 35°04′02″E
- Palestine grid: 156/89
- State: State of Palestine
- Governorate: Hebron

Government
  - Type: Municipality
  - Head of Municipality: abed ennabe elhawamde

Area
  - Total: 13.8 km^{2} (5.3 sq mi)

Population (2017)
  - Total: 26,011
  - Density: 1,880/km^{2} (4,880/sq mi)
- Name meaning: originally Eshtemoa, "Place where prayer is heard"

As Samu' or es-Samu' (Arabic: السموع) is a town in the Hebron Governorate of the West Bank, Palestine, 12 kilometers south of the city of Hebron and 60 kilometers southwest of Jerusalem. The town had a population of 26,011 in 2017.

As-Samu' is located on a tell identified with the ancient Eshtemoa, from which it derives its name. Initially a small village in the early Ottoman era, as-Samu' gradually grew into a larger settlement over the years. In 1966, it was the site of the Samu incident. Since the 1990s, as-Samu' has been governed by the Palestinian Authority as part of Area A of the West Bank. It is known for its handwoven kilims.

== Geography ==
The area is a hilly, rocky area cut by some wadis. The Armistice Demarcation Line (ADL, Green line) runs generally east to west approximately five kilometers south of as-Samu'. The village of as-Samu' is located on twin hills with a wadi varying from shallow to deep between them. According to the Palestinian Central Bureau of Statistics the town had a population of 19,649 in 2007.

== History ==
=== Iron Age ===
==== Iron Age II ====
As-Samu' is built upon a tell identified with the biblical Eshtemoa mentioned in various historical sources. In 1971, five pottery jars dated to the 9th-8th centuries BCE were found in as-Samu', bearing inscriptions written in the Paleo-Hebrew alphabet. These jars contained one of the largest silver hoards ever found in Palestine.

=== Classical period ===
In the 4th-century CE, Eshtemoa was described by Eusebius in his Onomasticon as a large Jewish village.

In the late 19th century, a number of explorers visited the village and documented carved architectural elements scattered within it. These elements were incorporated into the walls of the village houses, with some reportedly adorned with a menorah and Hebrew/Aramaic inscriptions.

A distinctive burial cave from the second and third centuries CE was discovered at as-Samu'. It features an elliptical layout along with collection pits and storage chambers integrated into its walls. Inside, twelve intact Jewish ossuaries dating from Late Second Temple Period to the Late Roman period.

The remains of the "Eshtemoa synagogue" were identified at as-Samu' in 1934 with excavations following in 1935 and 1936. The synagogue is dated to around the 4th–5th century CE. Four seven-branched menorahs were discovered carved onto door lintels and one of them is displayed in Jerusalem's Rockefeller Museum.

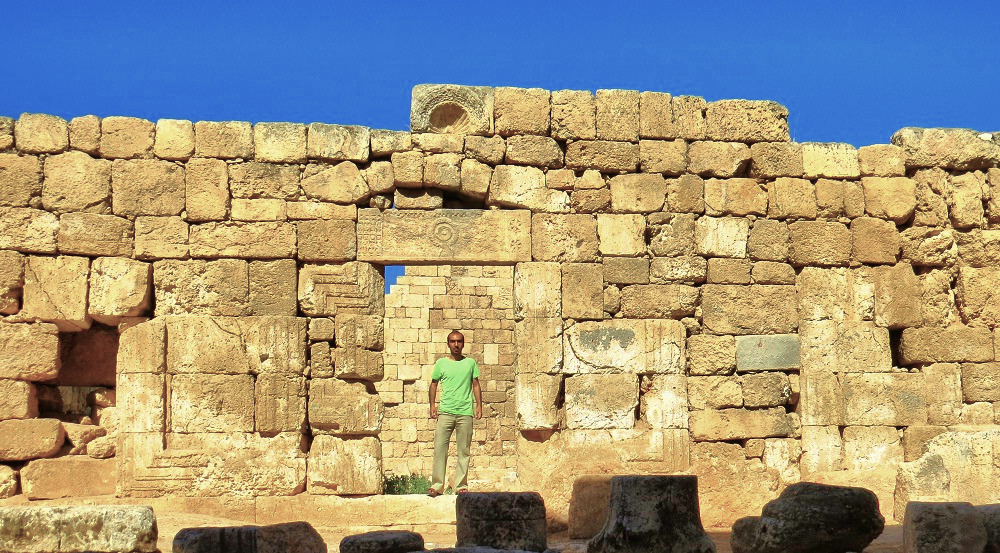
Eshtemoa synagogue/Omari Mosque at as-Samu' and dated to the 4th–5th century CE

=== Middle Ages ===
After the Muslim conquest, as-Samu' was resettled by Muslims. Under Islamic rule, the synagogue was repurposed as a mosque, which was constructed in its main prayer hall, with the addition of a mihrab. Some sources attribute the repurposing to the 7th century, during the Umayyad period, while Robert Schick suggests it may have taken place later, in the 10th century.

The building was earlier identified to be part of a 12th-century Crusaders tower.

=== Ottoman era ===
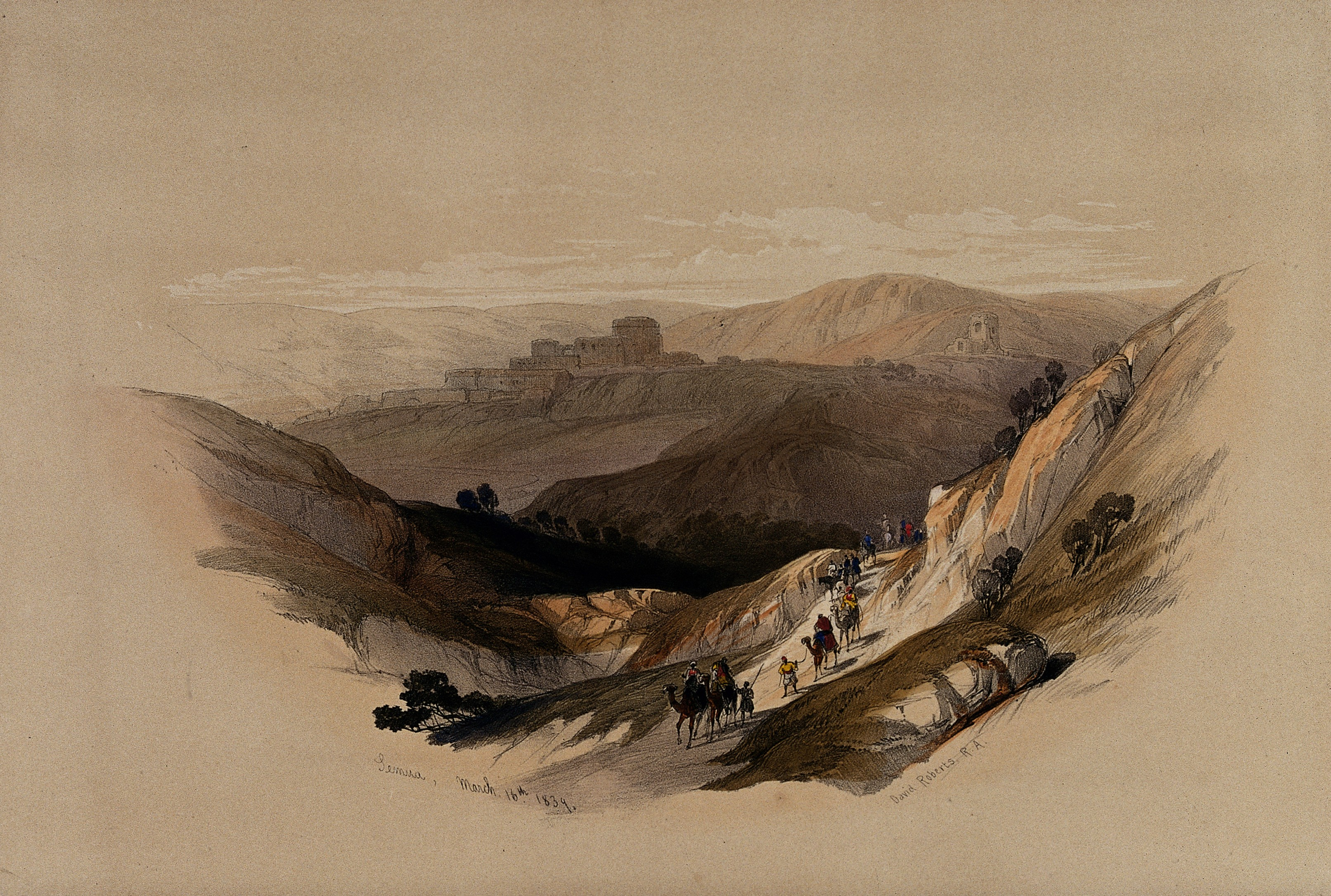
As-Samu in 1839, from The Holy Land, Syria, Idumea, Arabia, Egypt, and Nubia.

As-Samu' was incorporated into the Ottoman Empire in 1517. In the 16th century, it was a minor village, predominantly a cave settlement that remained stable over various periods. Its inhabitants routinely made seasonal journeys into the Samirah region.

In the census of 1596 the village appeared as being in the Nahiya of Halil of the Liwa of Quds. It had a population of 16 households, all Muslim. They paid a fixed tax-rate of 33,3% on agricultural products, including wheat, barley, vineyards and fruit trees, in addition to occasional revenues, goats and bee-hives; a total of 3000 akçe.

In 1838, Edward Robinson identified the town of Semua with biblical Eshtemoa. He described As-Samu as a "considerable" village..."full of flocks and herds all in fine order". He also found remains of walls built from very large stones, some of which were more than 10 feet long. In 1863 the French explorer Victor Guérin visited Semoua', and noted: "Semoua' is a village located on a high, oblong-shaped hill, occupying both its summit and slopes. Because of the altitude of the plateau on which it rises, this hill overlooks the surrounding area. At the highest point, you can see the remains of a fortress, part of which still exists. Built with very regular stones, it probably dates back to ancient times; however, it seems to have been repaired at different periods, particularly during the Crusades. The upper part is even more modern; it is currently the village's fortress."

An Ottoman village list from about 1870 found that as-Samu had a population of 298, in 77 houses, though the population count included men, only.

In 1883, the Palestine Exploration Fund's Survey of Western Palestine described it as "A village of moderate size, standing high. On the north is an open valley, and the modern buildings extend along a spur which runs out west from the watershed. The ground is rocky on the hills, but the valleys are arable land. There are remains of an ancient castle in the village, and other fragments. A church is said once to have existed here, and the ruins to the west show that the town was once much larger. To the south there are olives in the valley. To the north there are rock-cut tombs on the hill-side; the water-supply is from cisterns. The inhabitants number some 400 to 500 souls.

=== British Mandate era ===
In the 1922 census of Palestine conducted by the British Mandate authorities, As-Samu (called: Al Samu) had an entirely Muslim population of 1,600 inhabitants. In the 1931 census, As-Samu, together with Khirbat al-Simia and Kh. Rafat had a total of 1,882 Muslims, in 372 houses. In 1934, remains of the towns ancient synagogue were discovered and the site was later excavated in 1969, by Ze'ev Yeivin.

In the 1945 statistics the population of as-Samu' was 2,520, all Muslims, who owned 138,872 dunams of land according to an official land and population survey. 30 dunams were plantations and irrigable land, 40,398 for cereals, while 165 dunams were built-up (urban) land.

=== Jordanian era ===
In the wake of the 1948 Arab–Israeli War and the 1949 Armistice Agreements, As-Samu was annexed by Jordan along with the rest of the renamed ‘West Bank’. In 1961, the population of Samu was 3,103.

==== Samu Incident ====
In 1966 Israel launched a full-scale military operation against the town, which resulted in the deaths of fifteen Jordanian soldiers and three Jordanian civilians; fifty-four other soldiers were wounded. The villagers suffered 3 civilians killed and 96 wounded. According to David Dean Shulman, the villagers were unconnected to the incident that had triggered the reprisal. Much of the village was destroyed. The commander of the Israeli paratroop battalion, Colonel Yoav Shaham, was killed and ten other Israeli soldiers were wounded.

=== Israeli occupation ===
As a result of the Six-Day War in 1967, 'as-Samu came under Israeli occupation. The population in the 1967 census conducted by the Israeli authorities was 3,784. Under the Oslo Accords, the town was assigned to Area A.

It was reported in 2005 that 10,000 dunums of land in the towns of 'as-Samu, Yatta and ad-Dhahiriya near Hebron were to be seized by the Israel Defense Forces for the construction of the separation wall. Palestinian sources have alleged that settler violence from the nearby Israeli settlements of Ma'on and Asa'el has prevented them from accessing their fields.

== Demography ==
Among the residents of as-Samu are the Abu Awwad, al-Badareen, ad-Daghameen, al-Hawadah, al-Mahareeq, ar-Rawashdah, al-Salameen and az-Za'areer families.

== Culture ==
A headdress or 'money hat' (wuqayat al-darahem) from as-Samu (c. 1840s, with later additions) is exhibited at the British Museum. The caption notes that the headdress was worn in the 19th century and early 20th century during the wedding ceremony, especially for the 'going out to the well' ceremony when the bride appeared in public as a married woman for the first time. Generally, the headdress was considered to be one of the most important parts of the Palestinian costume.

As-Samu' is also known for its handwoven kilims.

== See also ==
- Eshtemoa synagogue

== Bibliography ==
- Barron, J.B., ed. (1923). Palestine: Report and General Abstracts of the Census of 1922. Government of Palestine.
- Ben-Yehûdā, Ḥ. and Sandler, Shmuel (2002). The Arab-Israeli Conflict Transformed: Fifty Years of Interstate and Ethnic Crises. SUNY Press. ISBN 0-7914-5245-X
- Bowen, J. (2003). Six Days: How the 1967 War Shaped the Middle East. London: Simon & Schuster. ISBN 0-7432-3095-7.
- Chen, S.: The Design of the Ancient Synagogues in Judaea: Eshtemoa and Horvat Susiya
- Conder, C.R.; Kitchener, H.H. (1883). The Survey of Western Palestine: Memoirs of the Topography, Orography, Hydrography, and Archaeology. Vol. 3. London: Committee of the Palestine Exploration Fund.
- Dauphin, C. (1998). La Palestine byzantine, Peuplement et Populations. BAR International Series 726 (in French). Vol. III : Catalogue. Oxford: Archeopress. ISBN 0-860549-05-4. (p. 972)
- Government of Jordan, Department of Statistics (1964). First Census of Population and Housing. Volume I: Final Tables; General Characteristics of the Population (PDF). Archived (PDF) from the original on 2015-04-03.
- Government of Palestine, Department of Statistics (1945). Village Statistics, April, 1945. Archived from the original on 2019-04-02.
- Guérin, V. (1869). Description Géographique Historique et Archéologique de la Palestine (in French). Vol. 1: Judee, pt. 3. Paris: L'Imprimerie Nationale.
- Hadawi, S. (1970). Village Statistics of 1945: A Classification of Land and Area ownership in Palestine. Palestine Liberation Organization Research Center. Archived from the original on 8 December 2018.
- Hartmann, M. (1883). "Die Ortschaftenliste des Liwa Jerusalem in dem türkischen Staatskalender für Syrien auf das Jahr 1288 der Flucht (1871)". Zeitschrift des Deutschen Palästina-Vereins. 6: 102–149.
- Hütteroth, W.-D.; Abdulfattah, K. (1977). Historical Geography of Palestine, Transjordan and Southern Syria in the Late 16th Century. Erlanger Geographische Arbeiten, Sonderband 5. Erlangen, Germany: Vorstand der Fränkischen Geographischen Gesellschaft. ISBN 3-920405-41-2. Archived from the original on 2024-09-28.
- Hussein of Jordan (1969). My "War" with Israel. London: Peter Owen. ISBN 0-7206-0310-2
- Mayhew, C.; Adams, M. (2006). Publish It Not: The Middle East Cover Up. Signal Books. ISBN 1-904955-19-3.
- Mills, E., ed. (1932). Census of Palestine 1931. Population of Villages, Towns and Administrative Areas. Jerusalem: Government of Palestine.
- Oren, M. (2002). Six Days of War. Oxford University Press. ISBN 0-19-515174-7
- Palmer, E.H. (1881). The Survey of Western Palestine: Arabic and English Name Lists Collected During the Survey by Lieutenants Conder and Kitchener, R. E. Transliterated and Explained by E.H. Palmer. Committee of the Palestine Exploration Fund.
- Pringle, D. (1997). Secular buildings in the Crusader Kingdom of Jerusalem: an archaeological Gazetter. Cambridge University Press. ISBN 0521-46010-7.
- Prittie, Terence (1969). Eshkol of Israel: The Man and the Nation. London, Museum Press. ISBN 0-273-40475-X
- Robinson, E.; Smith, E. (1841). Biblical Researches in Palestine, Mount Sinai and Arabia Petraea: A Journal of Travels in the year 1838. Vol. 1. Boston: Crocker & Brewster. (p. 312)
- Robinson, E.; Smith, E. (1841). Biblical Researches in Palestine, Mount Sinai and Arabia Petraea: A Journal of Travels in the year 1838. Vol. 2. Boston: Crocker & Brewster.
- Socin, A. (1879). "Alphabetisches Verzeichniss von Ortschaften des Paschalik Jerusalem". Zeitschrift des Deutschen Palästina-Vereins. 2: 135–163.
