= Don Klosterman =

Don Klosterman may refer to:

- Don Klosterman (American football) (1930–2000), American football executive
- Don Klosterman (soccer), head women's soccer coach at the University of Nebraska at Omaha
