= August Klostermann =

German Lutheran theologian (1837–1915)

August Heinrich Klostermann (16 May 1837, Steinhude, Schaumburg-Lippe – 11 February 1915, Kiel) was a German Lutheran theologian. He was the father of New Testament scholar Erich Klostermann (1870–1963).

== Biography ==
He studied at Erlangen University and Berlin (1855–58). He was assistant pastor in Bückeburg (1859–64), and then tutor (German: repetent) and lecturer (German: privatdozent) at Göttingen (1864–68). In 1868, he became professor of Old Testament exegesis at Kiel.

== Works ==
- Vindicae Lucanae (Göttingen, 1866).
- Das Markus evangelium nach seinem Quellenwerthe für die evangelische geschichte (Göttingen, 1867) – The Gospel of Mark according to source values in regards to gospel history.
- Untersuchungen zur alttestamentlichen Theologie (Gotha, 1868) – Studies of Old Testament theology.
- Probleme im Aposteltext neu erörtert (1883) – Problems of the Apostle texts newly discussed.
- Ueber deutsche Art bei Martin Luther (1884) – On German art by Martin Luther.
- Die Bücher Samuelis und der Könige ausgelegt (Nördlingen, 1887) – The Books of Samuel and Kings interpreted.
- Zur Theorie der biblischen Weissagung und zur Charakteristik des Hebräerbriefes (1889) – The theory of biblical "Weissangung" and the characteristic of the Letter to the Hebrews.
- Deuterojesaia, hebräisch und deutsch (Munich, 1893) – Deutero-Isaiah, Hebrew and German.
- Der Pentateuch (1893) – The Pentateuch.
- Geschichte des Volkes Israel bis zur Restauration unter Esra und Nehemia, 1896 – History of Israel until the restoration under Ezra and Nehemiah.
- Schulwesen in alten Israel (Leipzig, 1908) – Education in ancient Israel.
