= Onomasticon (Eusebius) =

Gazetteer on historical geography of ancient Israel

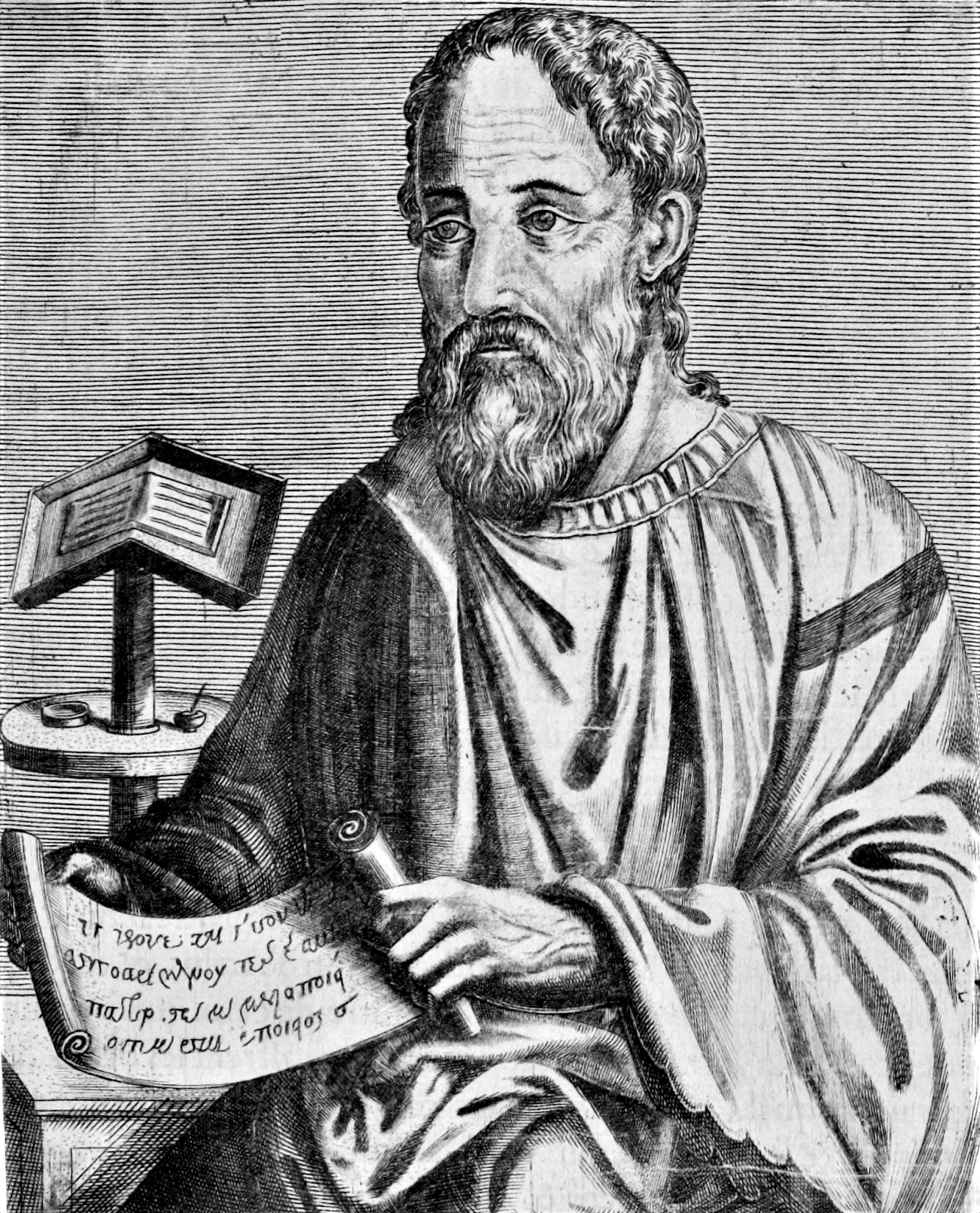
Early modern woodcut of Eusebius

The Onomasticon (Ancient Greek: Ὀνομαστικόν, Onomastikón), more fully On the Place Names in the Holy Scripture (Περὶ τῶν Τοπικῶν Ὀνομάτων τῶν ἐν τῇ Θείᾳ Γραφῇ, Peri tōn Topikōn Onomatōn tōn en tē Theia Graphē), is a gazetteer of historical and then-current place names in Palestine and Transjordan compiled by Eusebius (c. AD 260/265–339), bishop of Caesarea, and traditionally dated to sometime before 324.

The Onomasticon sits uneasily between the ancient genres of geography and lexicography, taking elements from both but serving as a member of neither. It is widely considered the most important book for the study of Palestine in the Roman period. Its influence can be detected both in the Madaba map and the accounts of early Christian pilgrims, and it most probably contributed to the Christian pilgrimage of the 4th century, constructing "The Holy Land" as a unifying idea for Christians. Even so, it appears that the Onomasticon was not meant to be a guide for pilgrims, as it did not mention places to be venerated, rather, its target audience was biblical scholars and the composition was meant as an exegetical tool for understanding scripture.

== Method and sources ==
Eusebius's description of his own method, who wrote: "I shall collect the entries from the whole of the divinely inspired Scriptures, and I shall set them out grouped by their initial letters so that one may easily perceive what lies scattered throughout the text," implies that he had no similar type of book to work from; his work being entirely original, based only on the text of the Bible. Some have stated that, based on the precise distances and directions he gave, Eusebius himself visited the locations he wrote about in many cases, though he explicitly relied on other testimonies at times, while sites with comparatively more complete descriptions may have been seen by Eusebius himself or a loyal informant, and the little information on concise entries may have been gleaned from scripture alone. Others have suggested that Eusebius had at his disposal early Roman maps of the Roman Empire with which to work, and which allowed him to record the precise distances between locations in Roman miles. In almost all of the entries in his geographical opus, Eusebius brings down the respective distances in Roman "milestones" (semeia) from major points of reference, such as from Jerusalem, Beit Gubrin (Eleutheropolis), Hebron, Ptolemais, Caesarea, etc. However, in the Onomasticon distances between each "milestone" were usually 1,600 meters–1,700 meters, while the standard Roman mile was 1,475 meters, and since most villages in the Onomasticon are far removed from Roman-built roads, scholars have concluded that Eusebius did not glean the geographical information from maps based on a milestone survey, but rather collected the information from some other source. Needless to say, this innovation has been very useful to modern research. Of the approximate 980 Biblical and New Testament names of places contained in those works, Eusebius identifies some 340 with locations known in his own day and age.

From the preface to the work it is apparent that Eusebius received guidance from Paulinus on the ways it may be improved and made worthy of publishing. Paulinus may have suggested that Eusebius add references to the New Testament, but if so Eusebius was not interested in completing the job, as only a few Gospel sites were mentioned in the work and Jesus is entirely absent from the entry on Bethlehem. A number of scholars have offered explanations for the rarity of references to the New Testament in the Onomasticon. Melamed suggested that Eusebius focused mainly on the sites mentioned in Hebrew scripture because he was using a Jewish written source. However, Taylor noted that early Christian exegetes as well as later pilgrims were wholly more focused on the Old Testament, thus sites such as Golgotha and Akeldama were added in the final stage of composition, possibly per suggestion of Paulinus and reflected in the end of the preface where Eusebius wrote that he would collect names "from the whole of divinely inspired scripture" (2:17-18) an assertion he would not substantiate.

The original scope of the work included three sections:

1. A transliteration of Hebrew ethnological terms from Hebrew scriptures into Greek.
2. A map or description of the allotments of the 12 tribes of Israel.
3. A plan of Jerusalem and the Temple.

The latter two sections were lost, but the fact that they concern matters from the Old Testament confirms that the surviving section was originally intended to encompass the place names from the Old Testament alone, with the New Testament as an afterthought.

In various entries, Eusebius compares different variants of Greek scriptural text and it is assumed that he used Origen's Hexapla as his master text. Of the six versions compared in the Hexapla, Eusebius used Origen's version of the Septuagint, which appeared in column 5 of the text, as the standard, and the variants from the other columns he referred to by using Greek abbreviations for each.

The place names in the Onomasticon are arranged alphabetically, according to the books in the Septuagint. It appears that the text was meant to be used as a reference, while studying a particular biblical book and upon encountering a place name beginning with a certain letter, the reader was expected to find the section with the letter, find the book they were studying and then locate the place-name within the work. The list begins with place names found in the Pentateuch, excluding Leviticus. It then proceeds to the books of Joshua, Judges, Samuel, Kings, 1 Chronicles, Isaiah, Hosea, Zechariah, Micah, Ezekiel, Amos, Jeremiah, Job, and 1 Maccabees (collectively referred to "Kingdoms"). The final entries are places mentioned in the Gospels, though some of these were appended to the listings under Kingdoms. The place names mentioned in Psalms, the Song of Songs, Obadiah, Joel, Jonah, Nahum, Zephaniah, Esther, Daniel, Ezra, Nehemiah, Habakkuk, Haggai, Malachi, Ruth, Proverbs, Ecclesiastes and Lamentations are absent, possibly because Eusebius did not have sufficient resources to supply more information about them. A minority of the entries are based on Eusebius's own observations, while the majority rely solely on textual sources and are notably concise.

Eusebius organizes his entries into separate categories according to their first letters. The entries for Joshua under Tau, for example, read as follows:

Tina (Kinah, 15:22): of the tribe of Judah.

Telem (15:24): of the tribe of Judah.
Tessam ([Azem] 15:29): of the tribe of Judah.

Tyre ([Zer] 19:35): of the tribe of Naphthali.

Where there is a contemporary town at the site or nearby, Eusebius notes it in the corresponding entry. "Terebinth", for example, describes Shechem as "near Neapolis", modern Nablus, and "Tophet" is located "in the suburbs of Jerusalem".

The primary source for the various editions of the Onomasticon is Codex Vaticanus, Gr. 1456 which dates from the 11th or 12th century. Erich Klostermann published a scholarly eclectic edition of the manuscript in 1904, using in addition four other manuscripts. Dependent upon the Codex Vaticanus manuscript is Codex Parisinus Gr 464 which dates from the 16th century. These two manuscripts were edited and published by Lagarde in 1870.

== Language, toponyms ==
Eusebius compiled his work in Greek, although a Latin translation of the Onomasticon was made by Jerome in little over half a century later. Greco-Roman referents are used by Eusebius in his Onomasticon for Hebrew names, such as Ailia for Jerusalem, Nicopolis for Emmaus, Diospolis for Lydda (Lod), Eleutheropolis for Beit Gubrin, Azotus for Ashdod, Jamnia for Yavne, Neapolis for Shechem, Scythopolis for Beit Shean, Diocaesarea for Sepphoris, Philadelphia for Amman, and Ptolemais for Acre.

== Date ==
=== Eusebius' Greek original ===
There is no scholarly consensus of when Eusebius wrote The Onomasticon, but it has traditionally been dated before 324, on the basis of its sparse references to Christianity, and complete absence of remarks on Constantine the Great's buildings in the Holy Land. The work also describes traditional religious practices at the oak of Mamre as though they were still happening, while they are known to have been suppressed soon after 325, when a church was built on the site. Eusebius references the encampment of the Legio X Fretensis at Aila (in southern Jordan, near modern Aqaba); the X Fretensis was probably transferred from Jerusalem to Aila under Diocletian (r. 284–305). According to Joan E. Taylor, the composition had to have been completed after 313, when Eusebius was nominated as the bishop of Caesarea, since he presents himself as such in the introduction to the work. Additionally, Taylor concluded that the introduction was most probably written last, given that it was written per recommendation of Paulinus bishop of Tyre, and Paulinus must have retired from his post prior to the Council of Nicaea in June/July 325, since he was not mentioned in the list of attendees. Carl Umhau Wolf proposed that the Onomasticon was dedicated to Paulinus on his retirement, and in that manner he explained the absence of the discoveries of Helena and Eutropia in locations such as the Golgotha and Mamre. Had the Onomasticon been completed after 325, there would have been mention of them. Wolf's suggestion may also explain Eusebius' use of the pre-Constantinian Roman name of Jerusalem - Aelia Capitolina. On account of these observations, Taylor concluded that the work should be dated between 313 and mid-325, but no later. However, the date of completion may be more accurately determined based on Eusebius' dedication of the 10th book of his Ecclesiastical History to Paulinius. The Ecclesiastical History concludes with the fall of Licinius in June 324, and since Eusebius wrote that he completed the Onomasticon after writing the ten books of the Ecclesiastical History, it may support Wolf's theory that it was a retirement gift to Paulinus, in which case it may be dated to early 325. The date on which Eusebius began his work on the Onomasticon is probably impossible to determine. It is known that Eusebius continuously edited and revised his Ecclesiastical History for 25 years, and considering the enormous amount of research required for a project like the Onomasticon, and assuming he followed the same working pattern, he may have begun working on it as early as 290. Additionally, the work itself gives the impression of something that was composed and expanded gradually over many years.

=== Jerome's Latin translation ===
In 388, Jerome translated Eusebius's Onomasticon into Latin while living in Bethlehem, and he retitled the work as Liber de Situ et Nominibus Locorum Hebraicorum ("Book on the Sites and Names of the Places of the Hebrews"). In the edition published by Paul de Lagarde, the Latin work compiled by Jerome is titled slightly differently, Hieronymi de Situ et Nominibus Locorum Hebraicorum Liber ("Jerome's Book on the Location and Names of Hebrew Places"). Jerome's Latin edition includes various designations, based on the different manuscripts available to him. This Latin version of Eusebius's Onomasticon became the main source for research of the Palestine region in the West.

== Demographics ==
The complete demographic diversity of the Land of Israel, or Palestine, in the 4th-century CE is not fully known. However, Eusebius who lived in Beit Gubrin (Eleutheropolis) speaks briefly about the country's ethnic make-up, principally, in the area of the country in which he was most familiar. Out of fourteen entries where he mentions the town's ethnic details, eleven of these settlements were Jewish, namely: Ekron, Anea (thought to be Khirbet Ghuwein et-Taḥta, now a ruin), Debir [sic], En-Gedi, Eshtemoh, Hormah, Thalca, Juttah, Nineveh [sic], Naarah, and Carmel (mentioned incidentally to Ziph); one a Samaritan village: Tirzah (Thersila) in Batanaea; and two Christian settlements: Anaea and Jattir. The town Debir [sic], being "Dabeira on Mount Thabor, in the borders of Diocaesarea" in Lower Galilee had a sizable Jewish population.

== Editions ==
- Wolf, Carl Umhau (1971). Eusebius of Caesarea, Onomasticon (OCLC 70198933)
- Eusebius (1862). F. Larsow & G. Parthey (ed.). Eusebii Pamphili Episcopi Caesariensis Onomasticon : urbium et locorum Sacrae Scripturae (in Greek and Latin).
- de Lagarde, P., ed. (1870). Onomastica sacra. Göttingen: A. Rente. OCLC 6826073. (2nd ed. 1887; reprinted in Hildesheim: Georg Olms, 1966)

(In this edition the Greek and Latin texts do not appear in parallel but in succession: first Latin, then Greek. The editor provides the material with references to biblical and other sources, without introductory notes and commentary)

- Klostermann, Erich, ed. (1904). Das Onomastikon der biblischen Ortsnamen. Leipzig: J. C. Hinrichs. OCLC 953603156. (reprinted in Hildesheim: Georg Olms, 1966. OCLC 748997898)

(The first critical edition of the Onomasticon)

- Chapmann III, Rupert L.; Taylor, J.E., eds. (2003). Palestine in the Fourth Century A.D.: The Onomasticon by Eusebius of Caesarea. Translated by G.S.P. Freeman-Grenville. Jerusalem: Carta. ISBN 965-220-500-1. OCLC 937002750. At Internet Archive: here accessed 19 Feb 2025)

(The first English translation both of the Greek text by Eusebius and of the Latin translation by Jerome)

- Notley, R.S.; Safrai, Z., eds. (2005). Eusebius, Onomasticon: The Place Names of Divine Scripture. Boston / Leiden: E.J. Brill. ISBN 0-391-04217-3. OCLC 927381934.

(A triglott edition - in Greek, Latin, and English, with notes and commentary)
