= Erich Klostermann =

German New Testament scholar and philologist

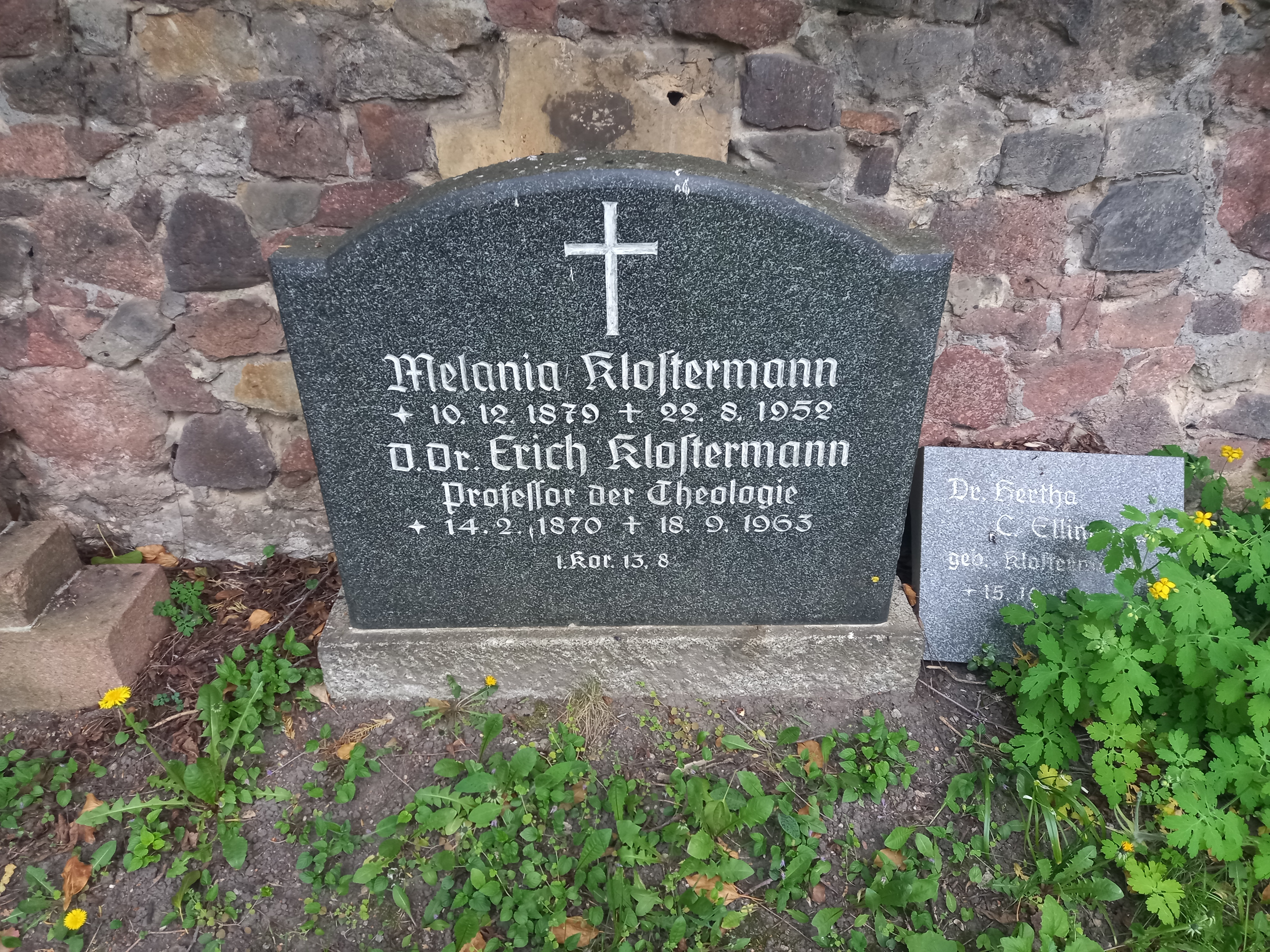
Gravestone of Erich Klostermann and his wife Melania (née Smugge) at St. Laurentius zu Halle Protestant cemetery

Erich Klostermann (14 February 1870 – 18 September 1963) was a German scholar of the New Testament, patristics, and classical philology. He was particularly known for his New Testament commentaries on the gospels of Mark, Matthew, and Luke. He published editions of works of the Church Fathers Eusebius and Origen.

== Biography ==
Erich Klostermann was born in Kiel in 1870. His father was the Protestant theologian and Old Testament scholar August Klostermann, a professor at Kiel University. Erich also studied at Kiel, and he received his doctorate in 1892 from the Department of Philology with a dissertation on the Book of Ecclesiastes (De libri Coheleth versione Alexandrina). He visited Italy for research, but then returned to Germany to further study both theology and Oriental studies. After his doctorate he met with Adolf von Harnack, the most distinguished scholar of patristics of the era, who was able to persuade him to join the Church Fathers Commission of the Prussian Academy of Sciences in Berlin. He worked under both Harnack and historian Theodor Mommsen. In Berlin, he published a series of writings on Origen of Alexandria and Eusebius of Caesarea, as well as translations of their work. These texts were in the series Die Griechischen Christlichen Schriftsteller (The Greek Christian Writers of the First Three Centuries). The Berlin Theological Faculty awarded him an honorary licentiate. He completed his habilitation in 1901, and the University of Kiel offered him a position as a lecturer (but not on a tenure track). In 1905, Hans Lietzmann recruited him to work on the Handbuch zum Neuen Testament (Handbook of the New Testament). He wrote commentaries on Mark (1907), Matthew (1909), and Luke (1919). These commentaries were well-regarded and praised, and stayed in print for some time after Klostermann's death.

In 1907 he was appointed as an associate professor of New Testament and early Christian literature at Kiel. In 1911, he received an honorary doctorate from the University of Jena. He also finally gained a job as a full professor in 1911, at Kaiser-Wilhelm-Universität (the modern University of Strasbourg) in Strassburg, Alsace–Lorraine. During World War I he served as a hospital chaplain in addition to his professorship in Strasbourg. For his work, he received the Red Cross Medal and the Iron Cross, Second Class. At the end of the war in 1918, Alsace was returned to France, and all the German professors were expelled from Strassburg (now Strasbourg). In 1919, he took a job at University of Münster, and in 1923, he moved to the University of Königsberg to teach there. In 1927 he was appointed a corresponding member of the Prussian Academy of Sciences.

In 1928, he once again received a full professorship position, this time at Martin Luther University Halle-Wittenberg in Halle (Saale). At Halle he resumed his work on the commentaries, and focused on Origen's commentary on Matthew, taking advantage of the university's extensive collection of patristics which he became the main curator of. After Harnack's death, in 1931 Klostermann became co-editor of Texte und Untersuchungen zur Geschichte der altchristlichen Literatur (Texts and Studies on the History of Early Christian Literature). Klostermann took emeritus status in 1936. In his retirement, he undertook a new edition of the Homilies of Macarius-Symeon, but he was unable to complete it. After the fall of the Nazi government and subsequent de-Nazification efforts in 1945 removing various compromised staff members, Klostermann was reactivated from retirement to teach again. He continued teaching at Halle until 1954.

== Personal life ==
In his personal life, Klostermann married Melania Smugge in 1902. The couple had 2 sons and 1 daughter.

Politically, Klostermann was generally involved in national-conservative parties. In 1911 he was a member of the Free Conservative Party (FKP) and was a co-founder of a rightist local party in Alsace. After 1918 he joined Der Stahlhelm, a league of German war veterans. From 1918 to 1928 he was a member of the monarchist German National People's Party (DVNP) that sought to return to something like the 1871–1918 German Empire's political structure. He also briefly worked with the National Socialist People's Welfare (NSV) before 1933. While much of the DVNP was eventually co-opted by the Nazi Party (NSDAP), Klostermann was not; he publicly refused to join the NSDAP and financially supported Jewish colleagues who were dismissed from their university jobs after the Nazi rise to power. After 1945, he became a member of the Christian Democratic Union (CDU), a center-right party.

Klostermann's wife Melania died in 1952. Erich Klostermann died in 1963, and was buried in the St. Laurentius zu Halle Protestant cemetery.

== Selected works ==
- De libri Coheleth versione Alexandrina (on the Book of Ecclesiastes, also known as Qohelet; in Latin)
- Origenes Werke 3. Band. Jeremiahomilien, Klageliederkommentar, Erklärung der Samuel und Königsbücher. Die griechischen christlichen Schriftsteller der ersten drei Jahrhunderte, Origenes 3. Band. 1901. (translation of works of Origen of Alexandria)
- Apocrypha Teil I: Reste des Petrusevangeliums, der Petrusapokalypse und des Kerygma Petri (1903) (translations of the Gospel of Peter, Apocalypse of Peter (Akhmim version), and Clementine literature (the Kerygmata Petrou)
- Eusebius Werke: Das Onomastikon der biblischen Ortsnamen. Die griechischen christlichen Schriftsteller der ersten drei Jahrhunderte, Eusebius Werke Band 3, erste Hälfte, Leipzig 1904. (Translation of works of Eusebius of Caesarea)
- Eusebius Werke: Gegen Marcell; über die kirchliche Theologie; die Fragmente Marcells. Die griechischen christlichen Schriftsteller der ersten drei Jahrhunderte, Eusebius Werke Band 4, Leipzig 1906. (Translation of works of Eusebius of Caesarea)
- Das Markusvangelium (1907) Handbuch zum Neuen Testament, Tübingen. (Commentary on the Gospel of Mark)
- Das Matthäusevangelium (1909) Handbuch zum Neuen Testament, Tübingen. (Commentary on the Gospel of Matthew; 1927 edition linked)
- Das Lukasevangelium (1919). Handbuch zum Neuen Testament Band II,1 Tübingen. (Commentary on the Gospel of Luke)
