= Horvat 'Anim =

Archaeological site at Lower Ghuwein in Israel

Khirbet Ghuwein al-Tahta خربة غويين التحتا Horvat ʽAnim (חורבת ענים)
- Ruin / archaeological hamlet
- Location within Israel
- Coordinates: 31.3536°N 35.0635°E
- Country: Israel
- District: Southern District

Population
  - Total: Uninhabited (ruins)
- Time zone: UTC+2 (IST)
  - Summer (DST): UTC+3 (IDT)
- Also known as: Khirbet Ghuwein et-Taḥta; Lower Ḥorvat ʽAnim

Anim Synagogue (at Lower ʽAnim)
- Interactive map of Anim Synagogue (at Lower ʽAnim)
- Type: Ancient synagogue
- Periods: Roman–Byzantine

History
- Built: 4th–7th centuries CE
- Abandoned: 7th–8th centuries CE

Site notes
- Excavation dates: 1988–1989
- Archaeologists: Z. Ilan; Dan Urman
- Public access: Yes

Horvat ʽAnim (Hebrew: חורבת ענים) or Khirbet Ghuwein al-Tahta (Arabic: خربة غويين التحتا, “Lower Ghuwein”) is a archeaological site in the southern fringes of the Hebron Hills, within Israel's Southern District, inside Yatir Forest. It is identified with the lower of the two Anim/Anaia from Biblical times and Late Antiquity and preserves the remains of the Anim Synagogue.

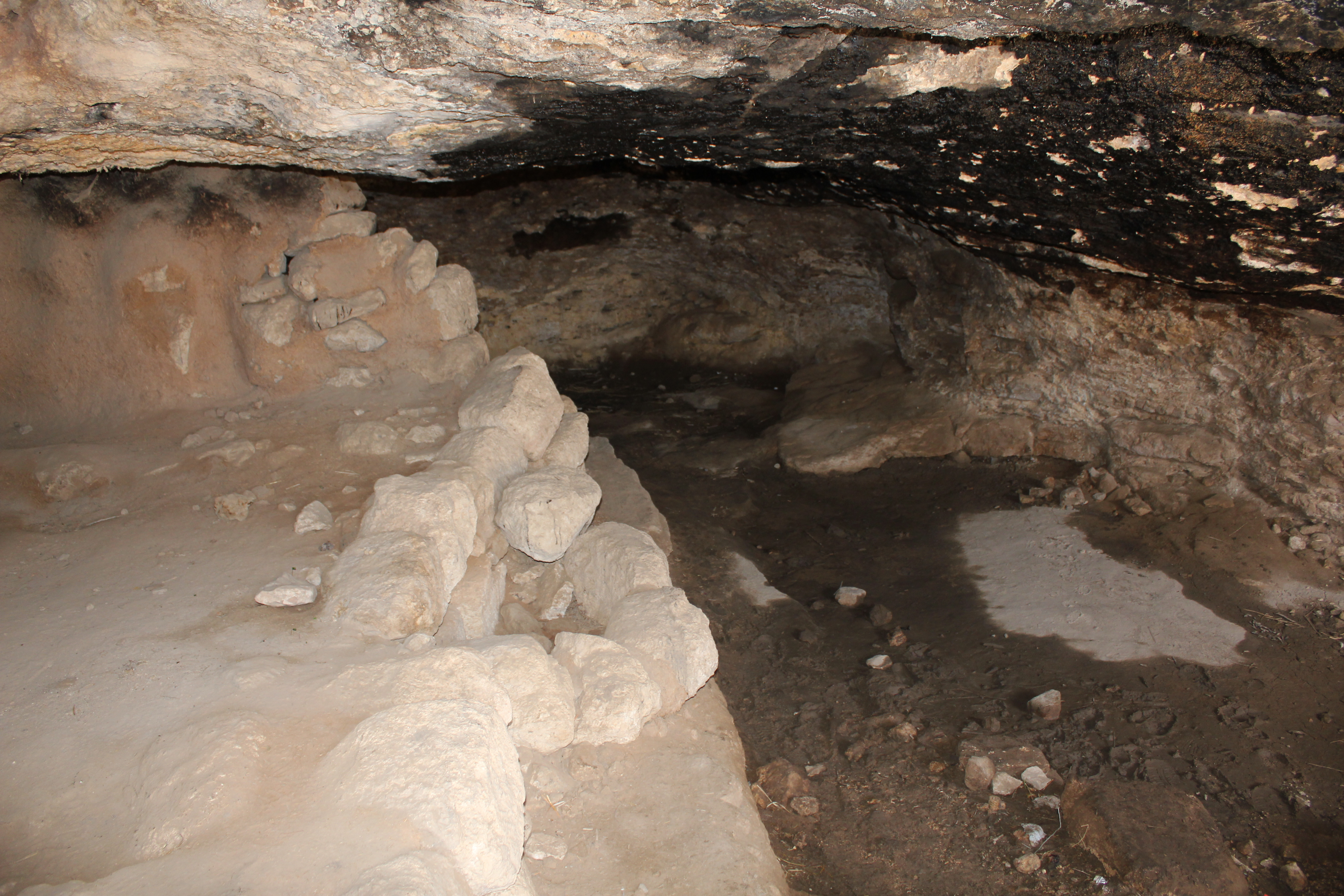
One of the caves used as a home next to the synagogue at Horvat Anim.

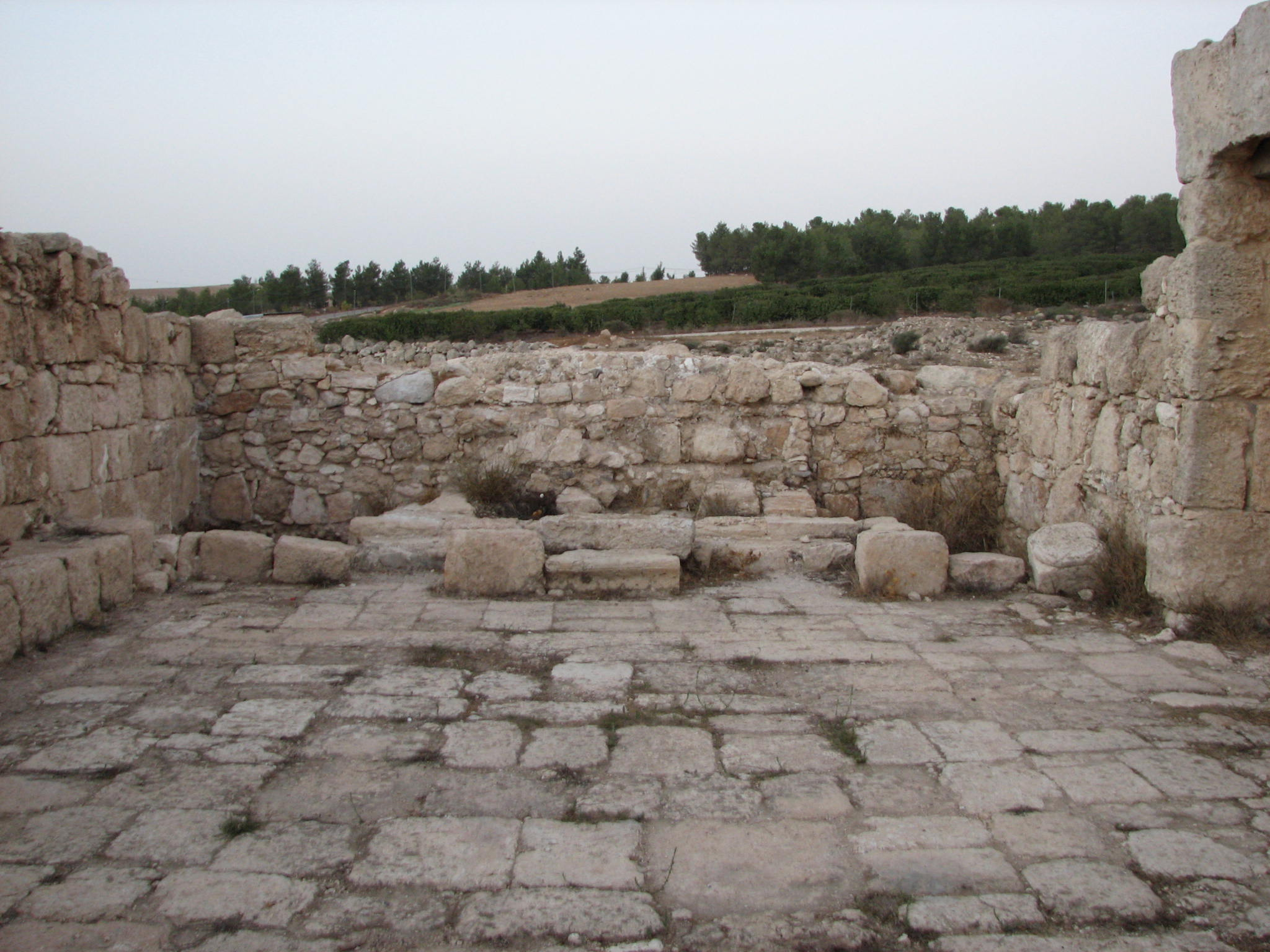
Archaeological remains of the Anim Synagogue. View to the Yatir Forrest.

== Geography ==
Lower ʽAnim lies on a rocky hill within the Yattir uplands at the northern edge of the Negev. The ruins area is studded with caves, water cisterns, stone fences, and rock-cut installations typical of dry-farming landscapes in the southern Judean hills.

== History ==
Scholars identify Lower 'Anim with the Jewish settlement mentioned by Eusebius as Anaia, pairing it with a Christian counterpart at Upper Anim (Arabic: Khirbet Ghuwein al-Fauqa) nearby. The site preserves caves, cisterns and architectural remains that 19th-century explorers described in detail.

Nineteenth-century and early twentieth-century surveys record the location as an Arab hamlet/ruin known as Khirbet Ghuwein et-Tahta (Lower Ghuwein).

In 1838, Edward Robinson noted al-Ghuwein as a ruin located southwest of el-Khulil.

In the 1870s, Survey of Western Palestine recorded Khurbet el Ghuwein et Taḥta as consisting of “traces of ruins and caves.”

The surrounding area formed part of the southern Hebron/Judean hills rural economy based on field crops, use of water cisterns and seasonal cave dwellings.

Before 1948, the site served as an Arab hamlet for seasonal agro-pastoral use; the site today is uninhabited Following 1949, the site has lain within Israel and today is encompassed by the Yatir Forest recreational area; the ruins are accessible by marked trails.

== Anim Synagogue ==
Archaeological remains of a rectangular, basilical synagogue (approx. 14.5 × 8.5 m) date its main phase to the 4th–7th centuries CE, with later conversion to a mosque in the early Islamic period. Excavations by Z. Ilan and Dan Urman (1988–89) reported standing hewn-stone walls to c. 3.5 m, an eastern entrance with preserved lintels, traces of a mosaic pavement beneath a later stone floor, and inscription fragments. The synagogue at Lower ʽAnim is paired historically with a Byzantine-era church on the hill east of Upper ʽAnim, reflecting the Christianisation patterns of the South Hebron Hills in late antiquity.

== See also ==
- Khirbet Ghuwein al-Fauqa – the upper (Fauqa) hamlet 2–5 km to the northeast
- Masafer Yatta – wider South Hebron Hills context
