= Ma'in, Hebron =

Village in West Bank, Palestine

Ma'in
- Municipality type D (Village council)

Arabic transcription(s)
  - Arabic: معين
  - Latin: Ma'in (official) ?
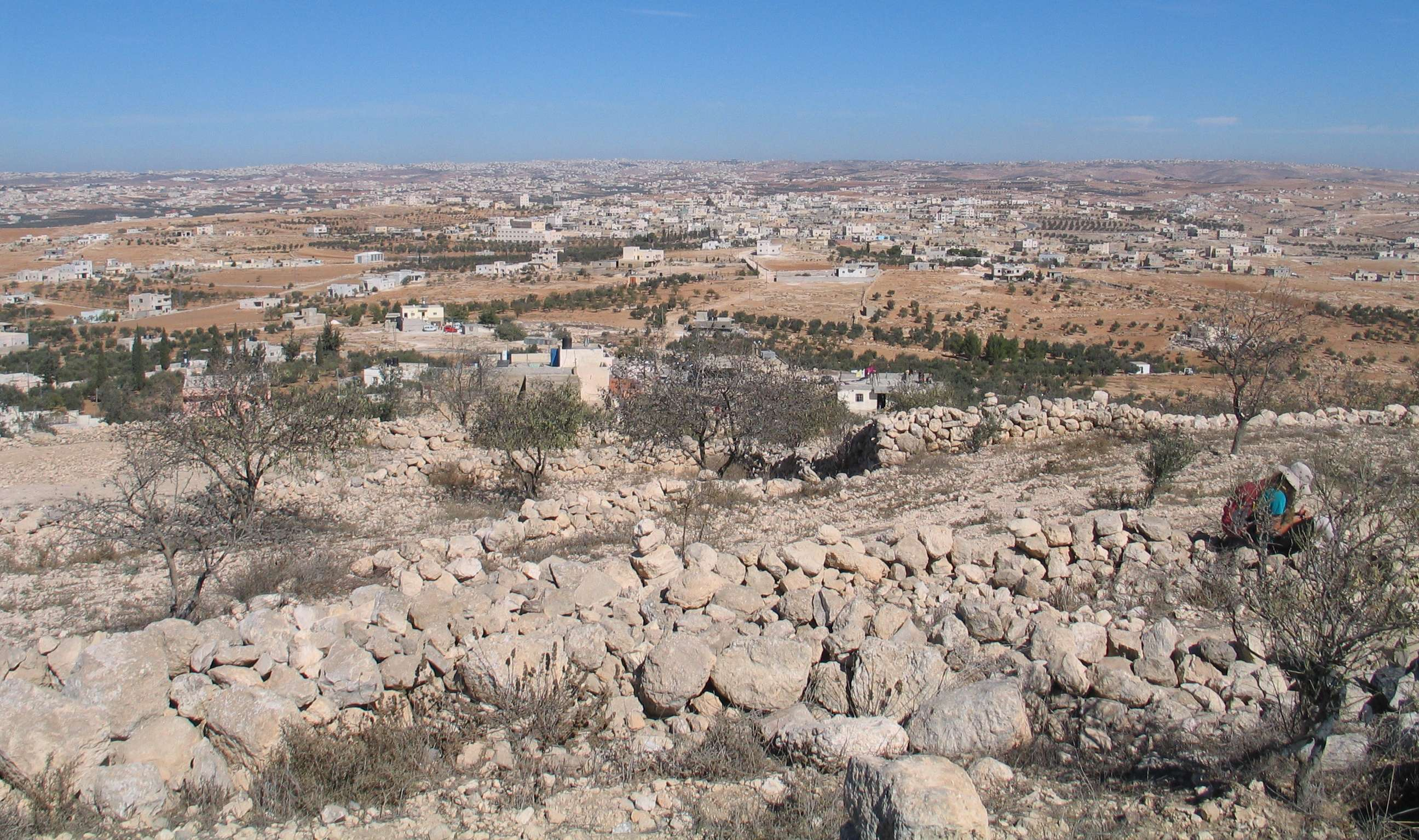
- Ma'in as seen from the archaeological site

- Location of al-Karmil within Palestine
- Coordinates: 31°24′36.7″N 35°07′54″E
- Palestine grid: 162/090
- State: State of Palestine
- Governorate: Hebron

Government
  - Type: Village council

Ma'in (Arabic: معين) is a small Palestinian village in the south Hebron Hills of the Hebron Governorate, located 14 kilometers south of Hebron. It is bordered by the villages of at-Tuwani to the east, al-Karmil village to the north, Khallet Salih to the west, and Qawawis to the south. According to the Palestinian Central Bureau of Statistics, the village had a population of 459 in 2007.

The village is situated immediately to the north of Khirbet Ma'in (Horvat Maon), an archaeological site containing the remains of the ancient town of Ma'on. It is home to members of several clans, including Makhamra, Dababsah, Hamamdah, Muhammad, and Abu Taha.

== Name ==
Ma'in preserves the name of the ancient town of Ma'on, Hebrew for 'dwelling', 'habitation'.

== Services and work ==
Ma'in village has one religious establishment, the Hamza Mosque. The village lacks any health services, and the nearest health facilities are located in Al-Karmil, 2 kilometers away, or in Yatta, 7 kilometers away.

Despite having 8,000 dunums of agricultural land, about 80% of Ma'in's labor force works in the Israeli labor market. The remaining 20% are employed in agriculture (18%) and in the public and private sectors (2%).

== Demography ==
The residents of Ma'in belong to several families, including Makhamra, Dababsah, Hamamdah, Muhammad and Abu Taha.

== Archaeological site of Khirbet Ma'in ==
Ma'in is located just north of Khirbet Ma'in (Horvat Maon), an ancient tell comprising the ruins of ancient Ma'on. The site is mentioned as one of the cities of Judah, and hometown of Nabal the Carmelite. "The wilderness of Maon" appears in the Bible as a place of refuge for David when he fled from king Saul. Mekhilta of Rabbi Ishmael says that Rabban Yohanan ben Zakkai is said to have gone up to Maon of Judah.

Following the destruction of the Second Temple, Maon is referenced when Rabban Yohanan ben Zakkai is said to have traveled there. In the early 4th century CE, Eusebius' ''Onomasticon'' mentions Maon as being "in the tribe of Judah; in the east of Daroma." During this period, Darom (or Daroma) referred to the southern Hebron Hills, which retained a Jewish population living alongside a newer Christian one. The archaeological site has been inhabited for a long time, with evidence found from the Early Bronze Age and up to Late Antiquity. People living there during the Israelite period left behind potsherds with Hebrew inscriptions. In the 6th century, a Jewish population built the Ma'on synagogue. The lack of remains from the late 7th-early 8th century suggests the village was abandoned during that time.

== See also ==
- Horvat Maon – an archaeological site with the remains of ancient Maon, situated immediately south of the built area
- Ma'on, Mount Hebron – a nearby Israeli settlement
- Makhamra family – one of the clans living in Ma'in
