= Makhamra family =

Palestinian extended family

Makhamra family المخامرة
- Jewish-Palestinian family
- Parent family: Traditionally a Jewish Arab tribe from Khaybar, expelled from the Arabian Peninsula
- Current region: Majority in Yatta, Hebron Governorate, West Bank, also in Al-Karmil, Khirbet at-Tuwani, Ma'in
- Etymology: Winemakers
- Traditions: Islam, with preserved Jewish customs

The Makhamra family (Arabic: المخامرة), also Muhamara or Mahamara, is a Palestinian clan from the city of Yatta, in the Hebron Governorate, West Bank. It is one of the largest clans in the southern Hebron Hills and regard themselves as descendants of a Jewish tribe of Arabia. They have also preserved several practices of Jewish origin.

== Etymology ==
According to a common interpretation, in Palestinian Arabic the meaning of Makhamra is "winemakers", an act forbidden in Islam.

== Jewish origin theories ==
The Makhamra family has a tradition of descending from a Jewish Arab tribe from Khaybar which was expelled from the Arabian Peninsula.

According to one tradition, the ancestor of three of the six clans that make up the village was Muheimar, a Jew who came up from the desert with his tribe and conquered the village, probably in the second half of the 18th century.

Several theories exist regarding their origins. While some scholars accept their tradition of expulsion from Khaybar, others propose that they are remnants of Jewish population from the late ancient period, or Jewish refugees from Hebron during the Crusader era.

=== Reports ===
==== Yitzhak Ben-Zvi (1928) ====
Yitzhak Ben-Zvi, an ethnographer and historian who later became the second President of Israel, reported visiting Hebron in 1928 to study Jewish traditions in the Mount Hebron area. He noted that some Arabs preferred conducting business with Jewish shopkeepers, referring to Jews as awlâd 'ammnâ – "our cousins". Ben-Zvi was intrigued by accounts of Arab farmers purchasing Hanukkah menorahs and avoiding camel meat, unlike their Muslim neighbors.

During his research, Ben-Zvi learned about the Makhmara family, which had converted to Islam approximately two hundred years earlier, from David Castel, a Jewish resident of Hebron. Castel was told by his grandfather that the Makhamra family continued the practice of lighting Hanukkah candles. Yitzhak Ben-Zvi also learned from Hakham Yaakov Mani, another Hebronite Jew, that the Makhamra family might trace its origins to Jews from Hebron's Elharika neighborhood who fled the city during the Crusades and settled in nearby villages. A Yatta resident visiting Hebron verified the account to Ben-Zvi and noted that the clan included roughly 1,200 members back.

To further investigate, Ben-Zvi traveled to Yatta with two companions. He received a recommendation letter from the village's scribe for Jabarin ben Abd al Rahman, an associate of Sheikh Abu ‘Aram, who at that time served as the primary mukhtar of the Makhmara family. Upon their arrival, a young man recognizing them as Jews exclaimed awlâd 'ammnâ and guided them to Jabarin, who stated, "We the Makhamra are from the seed of Jews. Our forefather was a Jew who came here from the land of Khaybar."

Jabarin told Ben-Zvi that six families resided in the village, with three belonging to the Makhamra clan. These details remain accurate, with the majority of Yatta's residents identifying with one of these clans. Three families, known as "Makhamra Ulwia" or Upper Makhamra, reside in Yatta's upper areas, whereas the "Makhamra Tahta" or Lower Makhamra, including families like Abu ‘Aram and Hushiyeh, inhabit the lower part.

Jabarin informed Ben-Zvi that the Makhamra family's ancestor, Mukheimar, was a Jew who came from Khaybar, seized control of Yatta, and established his rule there. According to local tradition, Mukheimar reportedly fought and defeated forty robbers (or 39 robbers and one dog), killing them all in a single cave. Mukheimar had two sons, Salam and Awad, whose descendants settled in the two aforementioned neighborhoods. The Hushiyeh clan integrated through marriage, as Mukheimar's wife, the mother of his sons, was from the Hushiyeh clan.

Based on Jabarin’s account and additional information, including a battle involving Mukheimar's grandson against Ibrahim Pasha of Egypt in 1834, Ben-Zvi concluded that Mukheimar’s arrival in Yatta likely occurred in the early 18th century.

==== Wanderers' Association (1929) ====
The "Wanderers' Association", a group of secular Jewish travellers who toured the southern Hebron Hills in 1929 and published their findings and experiences in a series of articles in Haaretz, also wrote about the Makhamara family. When they arrived in Yatta, the locals told them that the name of their ancient village was "al-Jayur", and that "our forefathers were originally from the children of Israel; one family arrived here, possibly before 700 years ago, and they were known as 'Kheibar' [...] Our forefathers first engaged in a temporary war with the local populace, and later paid the entire price for the land. [....] back in Muhammad and Ali's time, when they conquered the towns with the sword, they forced us to convert, and since then, we are Muslim." When asked whether there were more Jews in the area, they replied that "There were many Jews in Hebron and the villages". They also added that several of them would not eat camel meat, which is forbidden in Judaism. The same visit was also reported in Davar.

In another article, David Benbenishti from the Wanderers' Association reported meeting two shepherds from the Makhamara family at Khirbet Khureisa, who also told them that their ancestors were Jews from Khaybar. When they later visited the nearby town of As-Samu, locals there informed them that several of the villagers were linked to the Makhamara family as a result of intermarriage and said that they regularly mocked them by stating, "You are Jews, so you are cheaters". Later, in Dura, they were also told about the Jewish origins of the Makhamara family; one local claimed they were from Khirbit Kheibar, which he claimed was a nearby ruin (but was not found on the map), while another claimed they came from Hebron.

==== The Palestine Post (1938) ====
In 1938, Arab families from Yatta were reported in The Palestine Post to celebrate the Jewish holiday of Hanukkah, lighting candles retrieved from the Jewish community of Hebron.

==== Sha'arim (1952) ====
In 1952, an article in شعريم Sha'arim reported that in November 1948, Abu 'Ayyash, a mukhtar and tradesman from the Makhamra family, was executed in Gaza, accused of espionage for the Jews due to his clan's Jewish ancestry. The article, written by Ben Zvi, noted that during this period, members of the Makhamra family had settled near Ruhama and Negba, where both local Arabs and Jewish settlers were aware of their Jewish roots.

==== Tzvi Misinai (2009) ====
Several members of the Makhamra clan were interviewed for a Channel 1 article about Tzvi Misinai and admitted that they are aware of their Jewish origins, although today they consider themselves Muslims for many generations since their ancestors converted to Islam.

==== Doron Sar-Avi (2019) ====
Historian Doron Sar-Avi noted the lack of intermarriage between Muslim residents of Yatta and the Makhamra clan residing in Yatta, as well as its daughter villages, Al-Karmil and Khirbet at-Tuwani. Sar-Avi recounted a chance encounter with three adolescents from Yatta in the fields of Ma'in. During the conversation, one of the adolescents identified his family as Abu 'Aram, part of the Makhamra clan. When asked about the family size in Yatta, he replied, "The Muslims are 50,000, and we are 60,000." Sar-Avi interpreted this distinction as indicative of a clear sense of separate identity among the youths.

Sar-Avi documented interactions with Yatta locals, highlighting resemblances to Jewish customs. In one case, a laborer from Yatta shared how his mother, while baking pita, would throw a piece of dough into the fire to ward off the evil eye, resembling the Jewish tradition of offering dough. Additionally, a man named Ishaq detailed his knowledge of an ancient synagogue's location in Yatta, a site his family had historically frequented and preserved, which he said was now underneath a modern school.

According to other reports, the Makhamra family in Yatta practice endogamy and do not intermarry with other local families. There are also mezuzah slots visible in building doorways.

=== Analysis ===
The Makhamra family's tradition of Jewish origin has been the subject of several explanations. Ben-Zvi, for instance, accepted the oral tradition according which the Mahkamras sprang from the Jews who were expelled from Khaybar in the Hejaz and eventually settled in Yatta.

Yatta has been identified with the site of the ancient town of Juttah, also mentioned in the Hebrew Bible. In the 4th century CE, Eusebius wrote that Yatta was "a very large village of Jews". In contrast to other areas of Judea, the southern Hebron Hills retained a Jewish population after the Bar Kokhba revolt, as evidenced by historical texts and archaeological sites (including multiple synagogues). The Jewish presence is recorded up until the Muslim conquest, when the synagogues of Susya and Eshtemoa were repurposed as mosques. It remains unclear whether local Jews had fled the area or had converted to Islam.

Another theory, backed by scholars such as Mordechai Nissan, contends that the current inhabitants of Yatta may be the descendants of a Jewish population that lived there during the Second Temple period and later converted to Islam. A 1989 article suggested that the name "Makhamra" is the Arabic equivalent of "Edomites", an ancient people who lived in the same area and converted to Judaism in the Hellenistic times. Ben-Zvi also mentioned Shalem's view, which suggests that the traditional descent from Khaybar actually refers to a nearby ruin of the same name, either located in close proximity to Khirbet Karmil (ancient Carmel), or identical to it.

== Today ==
In the 2010s, Makhamra clan members have been linked to Palestinian political violence. On June 8, 2016, two members of the clan, Khaled Mahmara and Muhammad Mahamara, carried out a shooting attack in Sarona Market, Tel Aviv, during which four people were killed. Some writers have attributed that activity to their desire to show their neighbors that despite their "Jewish past", they are sided with other Palestinians in the Israeli–Palestinian conflict.

Members of the clan constitute much of the population of Yatta, and also inhabit nearby villages such as Al-Karmil, Khirbet at-Tuwani, and Ma'in.

Members of the clan are today reluctant to acknowledge their Jewish origins.

Moshe Elad, a Middle East scholar, reported on Israel's Arabic-language television that two members of the Makhamra family had embraced Judaism and were now Israeli citizens living in the country.

== See also ==
- Arab groups with possible Jewish roots
  - Palestinians of Jewish ancestry – Palestinian families that claim Jewish ancestry
  - Bedul – Bedouin tribe in Petra with Jewish origin traditions
- Daroma – name of southern Hebron Hills in Late Roman and Byzantine periods, later adopted by Muslims. Had a Jewish population
- History of the Jews in Khaybar – Overview of Jewish history in the area
- Khirbet Kheibar – a site in the northern West Bank associated by local tradition with the Jews of Khaybar
- Yatta – the center of the Makhmara clan, confirmed by historical records and archaeological evidence as the site of an ancient Jewish town
