= Khirbet Kheibar =

Archaeological site in the West Bank

- Tell Kheibar
- Location within the West Bank
- 32°21′07″N 35°16′37″E
- Type: fortified tell
- Periods: Middle Bronze Age to Medieval period
- Cultures: Canaanite, Israelite, Mesopotamian, Roman, Byzantine, Arab
- Location: West Bank
- Grid position: 176/195 PAL

Site notes
- Height: 423 m (1,388 ft)
- Area: 35 acres (14 ha)
- Condition: In ruins

Khirbet Kheibar (Arabic: خربة خَيْبَر; Hebrew: ח'ירבת חייבר) or Tell Kheibar is an archaeological site located in the western outskirts of the Sanur Valley, West Bank. A fortified tell, it includes the remains of an ancient walled city that for some periods grew beyond the walls. At the site, pottery from the Middle Bronze Age and the Medieval period, peaking in the Iron Age, has been found, along with bowls and figurine fragments.

The site is also notable because of local peasant folklore from the 19th century that linked it to an earlier Jewish population, that may have been related to the Jews of Khaybar.

== Description ==
Khirbet Kheibar is situated on a hill near the western outskirts of the Sanur Valley, immediately northeast of the Palestinian village of Meithalun. The site is an archeological tell, located on an isolated hill. The eastern slopes of the hill are particularly steep.

An ancient city wall, some parts of which have been preserved to a height of three meters, surrounds the hill's upper flat summit. The space inside the walls is currently used for allotment farming and is around 5 dunams in size. The inhabited area was for some periods larger (at least during the Roman period) and expanded beyond the walls.

Smaller discoveries from Khirbet Kheibar include two figurine fragments, collared-rim jars, pottery with indentations, and wedge-shaped decorated bowls. The latter, thought to be of southern Mesopotamian origin, were found in several sites in Samaria, and are believed to have been brought to the region by Mesopotamian populations who were resettled in the area by the Neo-Assyrian Empire after the fall of Kingdom of Israel.

During the Middle Bronze Age, Khirbet Kheibar was a major city, and the nearby sites of El-Beiyadha and el-Mudawarra may had been its daughter-sites. Zertal suggested to identify the Iron Age site with the capital the Milcah clan, one of the sub-territories of the Israelite Tribe of Manasseh, adding that the name was preserved in the names Mirka and Wadi Milk, a nearby village and a riverbed valley, respectively.

== Visits, surveys and excavations ==
Victor Guérin visited the site in 1870, writing that “[...] on the foothills I found the remains of a wall built of large undressed boulders, which encircled the whole place. Inside it the slopes are all full with collapsed, small buildings, until three-quarters of the hill. Higher there is another wall of large undressed stones. Inside this there are rock-hewn cisterns, some collapsed structures and the foundations of a tower, 15 m long and 12 m wide.”

The SWP surveyors visited in 1872 and reported they had seen "the remains of a town and of a square building, perhaps a fort, on the top of the mound or tell". They gave a detailed description of the structure, noting that "the masonry of the fort resembles most closely the early Byzantine work".

W. F. Albright visited in 1925, and reported that the site only contained Roman, Byzantine, and Arab pottery, also adding that pre-Arab coins may have been discovered there.

Gophna and Porath conducted a site survey In 1967. In a report published in 1972, they noted the wall and stated that the inside space measured 120 m by 80 m.

Zertal visited the site in 1979 as part of the Manasseh Hill Country Survey.

A burial cave was excavated in 1985 on behalf of the Staff Officer for Archaeology of the Civil Administration of Judea and Samaria on the terraced western slopes of the hill as part of the approval of construction plans in nearby Meithalun. Six burial loculi, a number of staircases, and eleven human skeletons were discovered during the excavations, along with potsherds, pots, bowls, and two bottles from the late Roman and Byzantine periods, as well as eleven complete and two broken clay lamps from the Byzantine and early Islamic periods. The excavators suggested that the cave was used for burial by the inhabitants of Khirbet Kheibar.

== In local folklore ==
A local tradition brought by the Survey of Western Palestine linked Khirbet Kheibar to “a Jewish King, who is said by the peasantry to have lived in Sanur. His daughter had her summer residence near the tell in Merj el-Ghuruk”. However, they didn't make an effort to determine where this tradition originated.

Ilan cited local traditions connecting the tell's name to the Jews of Kheibar in Hejaz (7th century). A similar tradition is held by the Makhamara family of Yatta, in the southern Hebron Hills, who has a long standing tradition of descending from the Jews of Kheibar.

According to Breslavi, it is difficult to say with certainty that the site is connected to the immigration of Khaybar Jews to the Land of Israel. However, based on early Islamic Arab sources from the 7th up to the 9th century such as al-Waqidi which offer evidence that Jews expelled from Khaybar lived in Jericho, it is possible that some of them later migrated north to the area around Sanur and settled at the site.

== See also ==
- History of the Jews in Khaybar
- Makhamra family
- Yatta, Hebron
