= History of the Jews in Khaybar =

History of 7th century Jews in present-day Saudi Arabia

The Jewish community in Khaybar, which is north of Medina (formerly Yathrib), flourished in the 7th century.

== Migration to Khaybar ==
According to Jewish tradition, the first migration of Jews to Khaybar dates back, by some accounts, to the time of King David, others date it back to the time of Babylonian exile. The Jewish settlers of Khaybar were the descendants of Shephatiah the son of Mahalalel from the tribe of Judah and some settlers were descendants of the Cohanim.

== Economic activity ==
The Jews of Khaybar pioneered the cultivation of the oasis and made their living growing date palm trees, as well as through commerce and craftsmanship, accumulating considerable wealth. Some objects found by the Muslims when they entered Khaybar—a siege-engine, 20 bales of Yemenite cloth, and 500 cloaks—point out to an intense trade carried out by the Jews. In the past some scholars attempted to explain the siege-engine by suggesting that it was used for settling quarrels among the families of the community. Today most academics believe it was stored in a depôt for future sale, in the same way that swords, lances, shields, and other weaponry had been sold by the Jews to Arabs. Equally, the cloth and the cloaks may have been intended for sale, as it was unlikely that such a quantity of luxury goods were kept for the exclusive use of the Jews. However, these commercial activities led to some resentment that is similar to the economic causes that were behind persecutions in many other countries throughout history.

== Battle of the Trench ==
According to Islamic tradition, during the Battle of the Trench the community of Khaybar aided in rallying an army of 10,000 to "put down [kill] all the Muslims in Medina, men, women and children", as relayed by Umar. Midst the siege they sent delegations to the Jewish Muslim allies in Medina and successfully turned them against their Muslim neighbours, breaking the Medina Peace and Mutual Defence Treaty. However, modern researchers believe that the people of Mecca went to battle out of fear that the forces of Medina would seek revenge for the deaths of their fallen soldiers in the Battle of Uhud, a year and a half earlier. They wanted to strike Medina preemptively. Bedouin tribes, who coveted the wealth of the people of Medina and intended to plunder it, joined them. However they were defeated , and upon their return to Khaybar, the Muslims retaliated with a counter-campaign of 1,400 soldiers. The outcome did not exceed the death of 93 Jews and 18 Muslims, with 50 injured between parties.

== Expulsion of the Jews from Khaybar ==
During the reign of Caliph Umar (634–644), the Jewish community of Khaybar were ethnically cleansed to the newly conquered regions of Syria and Iraq. Umar also forbade non-Muslims to reside in the Hejaz for longer than three days.

== Later history ==
=== Medieval references ===
Despite the expulsion of Jews from Khaybar, they continue to appear in Middle Ages documents. Benjamin of Tudela, writing in the 12th century, recorded tales of the military prowess of the Jews of Khaybar in his time, and writes they sent questions to the Babylonian geonim. The Jews of Khaybar were also referenced by several Italian travelers such as Obadiah of Bertinoro and Ludovico di Varthema of Bologna; the latter claimed to have discovered 5,000 Jews in Khaybar when he paused there to water his camels. David Reubeni claimed he was born in a place referred to as Ḥabor or Khaybar and served as a general in a Jewish army there.

=== Heritage and folklore ===
The Jews of Khaybar are mentioned in several Arab traditions. The Makhamra family of Yatta, in the southern Hebron Hills, traces its ancestry to the Jews of Kheibar, and families in neighboring villages have similar traditions. Another tradition, told in the late 19th century by the fellahin of Meithalun, Samaria, mentions a Jewish king and princess who resided in the area. A tell named Khirbet Kheibar in local nomenclature is located at the village.

=== Contemporary political use ===
In recent decades, the terrorist organization Palestinian Islamic JihadHamas has revived the story of Khaybar's Jews being defeated and expelled and utilized it as a political slogan.

== See also ==
- Khaybar
- Battle of Khaybar
- Safiyya bint Huyayy
- Makhamra family
- Antisemitism in the Arab world
- Islam and antisemitism
