= Maon (city in Judah) =

Ancient biblical settlement near Hebron

Horvat Ma'on خربة معين Arabic ח'רבת מעין Hebrew
- Ruin
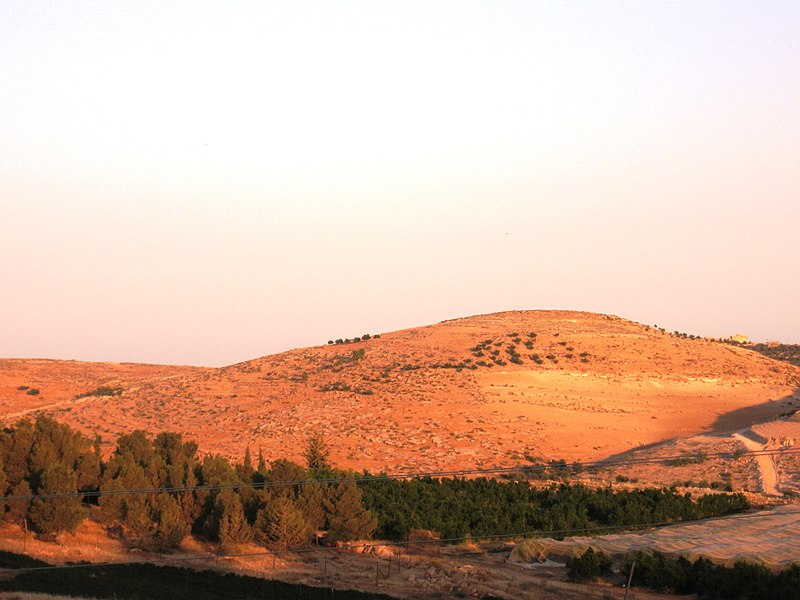
- Horvat Ma'on near Hebron (2008)

- Location of Horvat Ma'on
- Coordinates: 31°24′34″N 35°08′02″E
- Grid position: 162/090 PAL
- Region: West Bank
- District: Judea and Samaria Area

Government
  - Council: Har Hevron (Mount Hebron) Regional Council
- Time zone: UTC+2 (IST)
  - Summer (DST): UTC+3 (IDT)

Horvat Maon/H. Ma'on (Hebrew for 'Ma'on Ruins'), Arabic: Khirbet Ma'in or Tell Máîn (SWP map No. 25), i.e. 'Ma'in Ruins/Tell of Ma'in', is an archaeological site in the Hebron Hills, West Bank, rising 863 metres (2,831 ft) above sea level, where the remains of the ancient town of Ma'on (Hebrew: מעון) have been excavated. The town, now a ruin, is mentioned in the Book of Joshua and the Books of Samuel. It still had a Jewish population during the Roman and Byzantine periods, and a synagogue was discovered there. The site was ultimately abandoned around the time of the Muslim conquest.

The site is located about 6 kilometres (3.7 mi) southeast of Yatta. Immediately to the north lies the modern small Arab village of Ma'in.

== Etymology ==
The Hebrew name is variously spelled as Horvat Ma'on, Horvat Maon, or Hurbat Ma'on. Tel Ma'on is sometimes also used.

The Hebrew word ma'on means 'dwelling', 'habitation'.

Horvat, horbat, hurbat, hurvat are transliteration variants of the Hebrew word for 'ruins' and direct equivalents of the Arabic khirbet. Tell is the transliteration of the Arabic word, tel of the Hebrew one, both meaning mound created by accumulation of settlement layers.

== In ancient sources ==
=== Hebrew Bible ===
The site is first mentioned as one of the cities of Judah. Maon was the place of birth of Nabal the Carmelite. In the Book of Samuel, "the wilderness of Maon" is mentioned as a place of refuge for David when he fled from king Saul. The site is not referred to again in biblical sources.

=== Late Roman (?) and Early Byzantine period ===
After the destruction of the Second Temple, there is again a reference to the site, when Rabban Yohanan ben Zakkai is said to have gone up to Maon of Judah.

In the early 4th century CE, Maon was mentioned in Eusebius' Onomasticon as being "in the tribe of Judah; in the east of Daroma." During the Late Roman-Early Byzantine period, Darom or Daroma (Hebrew and Aramaic for "South") became a term used for the southern Hebron Hills in rabbinic literature and in Eusebius' Onomasticon. At the time, the Hebron Hills were demographically separated into two distinct districts, with only the southern one retaining a Jewish population along with a newer, Christian one. The site was eventually abandoned around the time of the Muslim conquest.

== Archaeology ==
=== Occupation periods ===
Archaeologists have discovered at the site potsherds dating back to the Early Bronze Age, the Iron Age (Israelite period) including jar handles bearing the palaeo-Hebrew inscription LMLK, 'for the king', and from the Hellenistic period. Sherds have also been found in situ from the Roman and Byzantine periods, as well as from the Middle Ages. Wine and olive presses from the Roman and Byzantine periods were discovered on the west slope of the tell. The ancient synagogue of Ma'on is dated to the Byzantune period (see below). The absence of material traces from the late 7th-early 8th century are an indication of the abandonement of the village at that time.

=== Byzantine-period synagogue ===
A synagogue dating back to the Byzantine/Talmudic period was discovered at Hurvat (Horbat) Ma'on. Two occupation phases were discerned, covering the 4th/5th through the 7th century.

=== 19th-century observations ===
In 1863, Victor Guérin visited. C.R. Conder of the Palestine Exploration Fund visited the site in 1874, during which time a brief description was written of the site:

Tell Maʻîn –– A mound some 100 feet high. On the west are foundations, caves, and cisterns, and foundations of a tower about 20 feet square. The masonry in this tower is large, with a broad irregular draft and a rustic boss. One stone was 3 feet 8 inches long, 2 feet 9 inches high, the draft about 3 inches wide. There is also a round well-mouth, 5 feet diameter, cut out of a single stone.

== 20th century ==
Horbat Maon is situated SE of the Arab town of Yatta, on the north side of regional highway 317. By the 1970s, a few Arab families from Yatta had settled on the northern slope of the tell, who work in subsistence farming and graze their flocks of sheep.

== Gallery ==
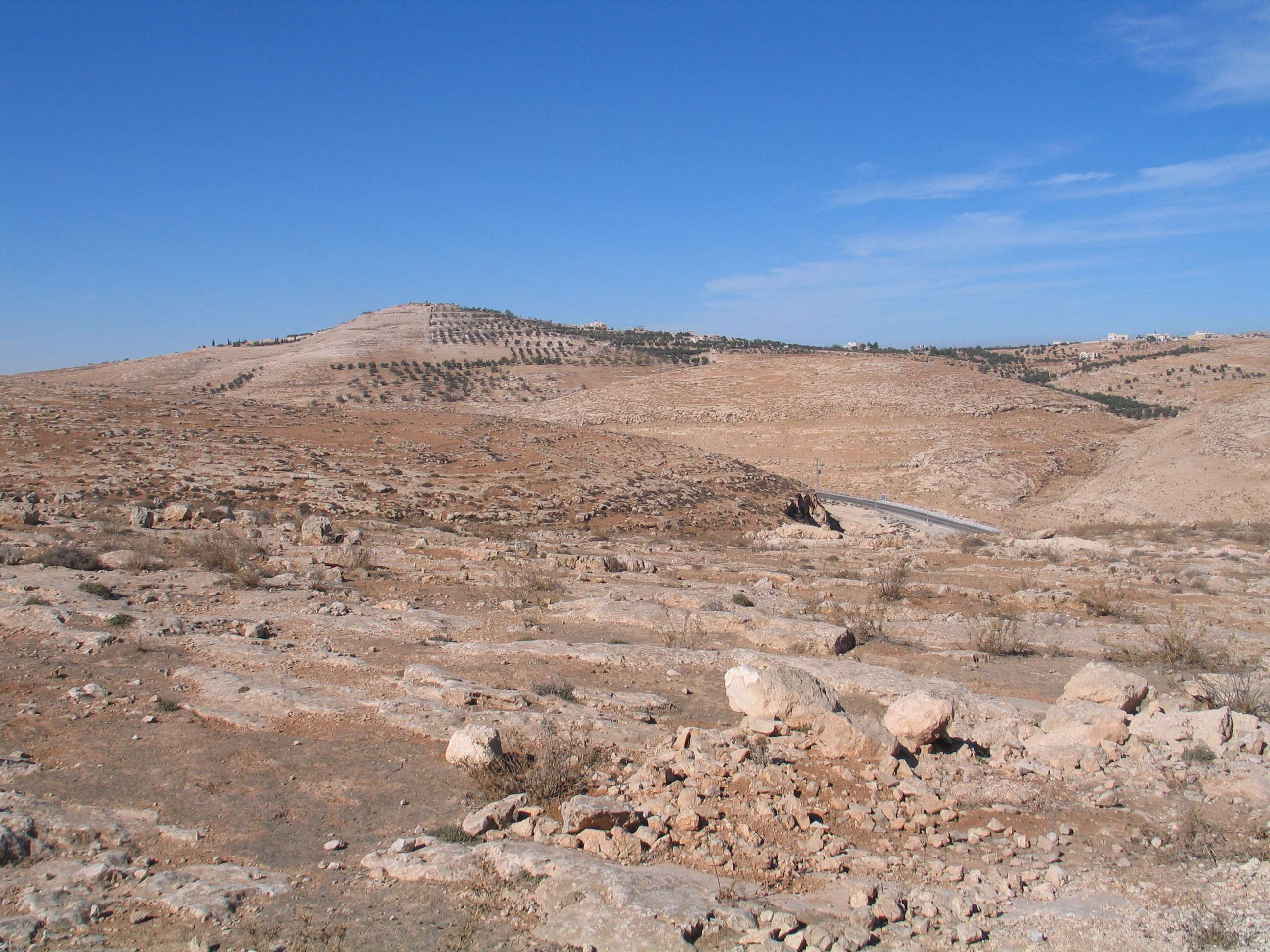
The ancient hill of Tel Ma'on, South Hebron Hills

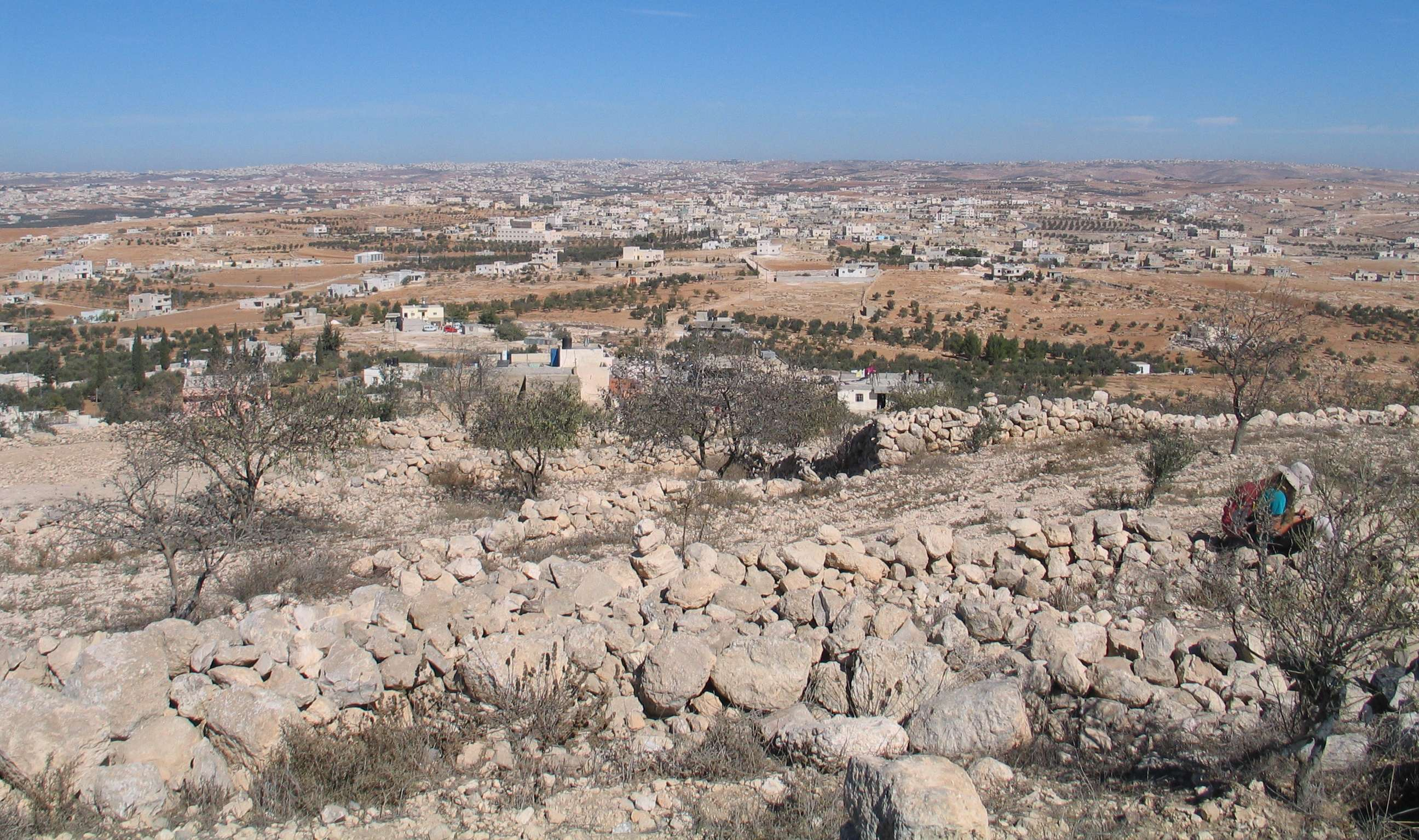
Tel/Horvat Ma'on near Hebron

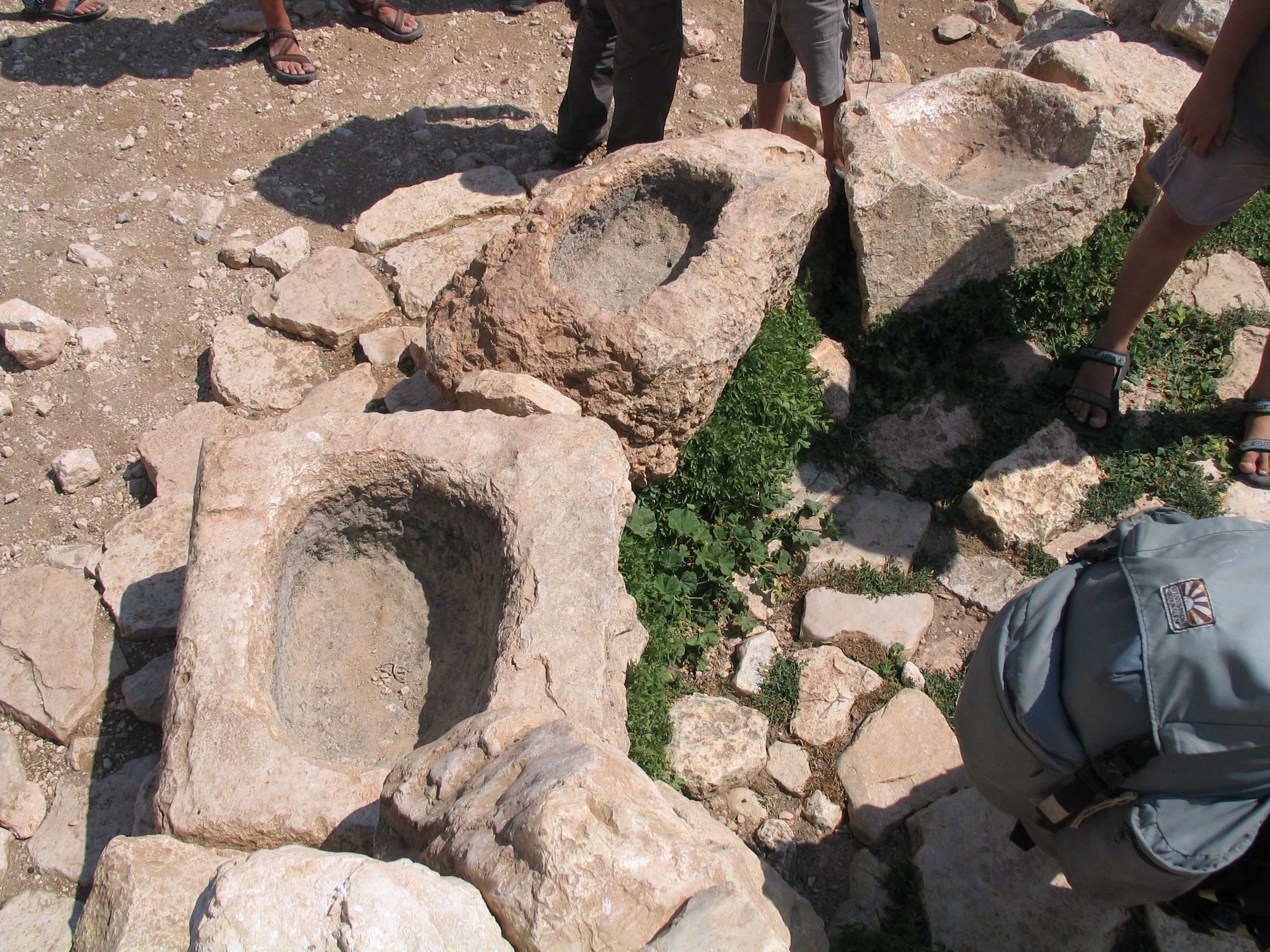
Stone troughs at the well of Ma'on

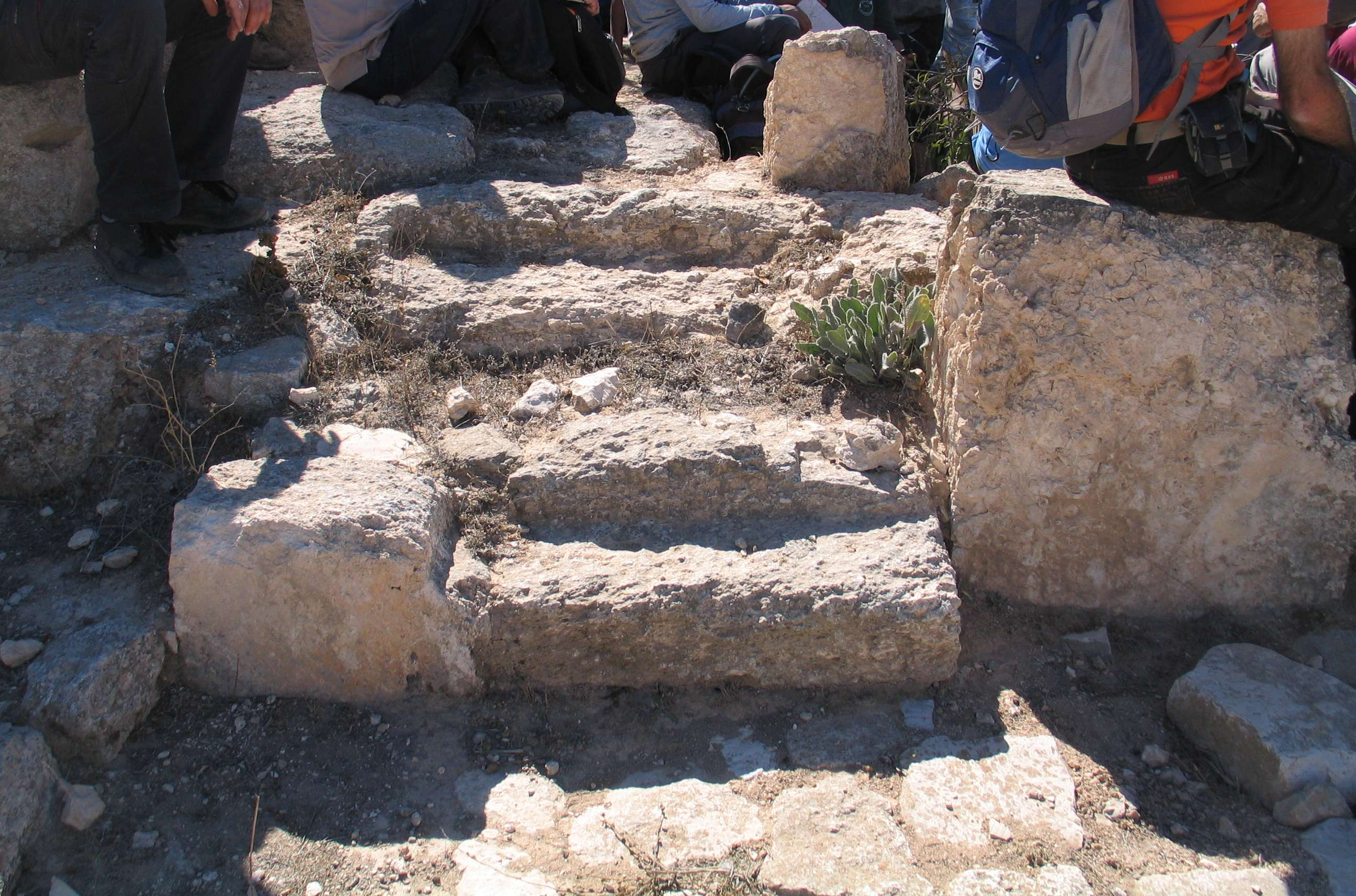
Staircase

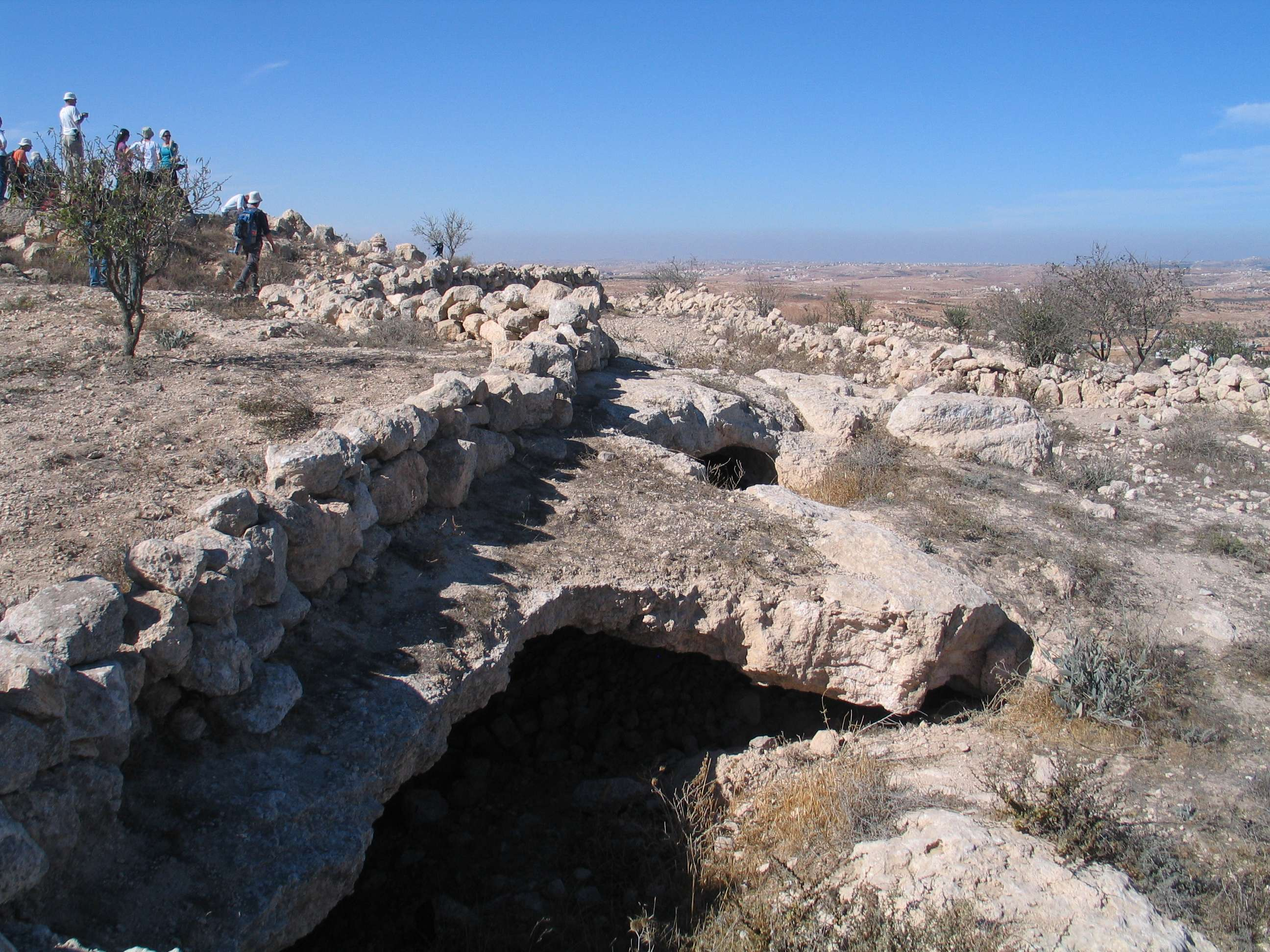
Ancient remains

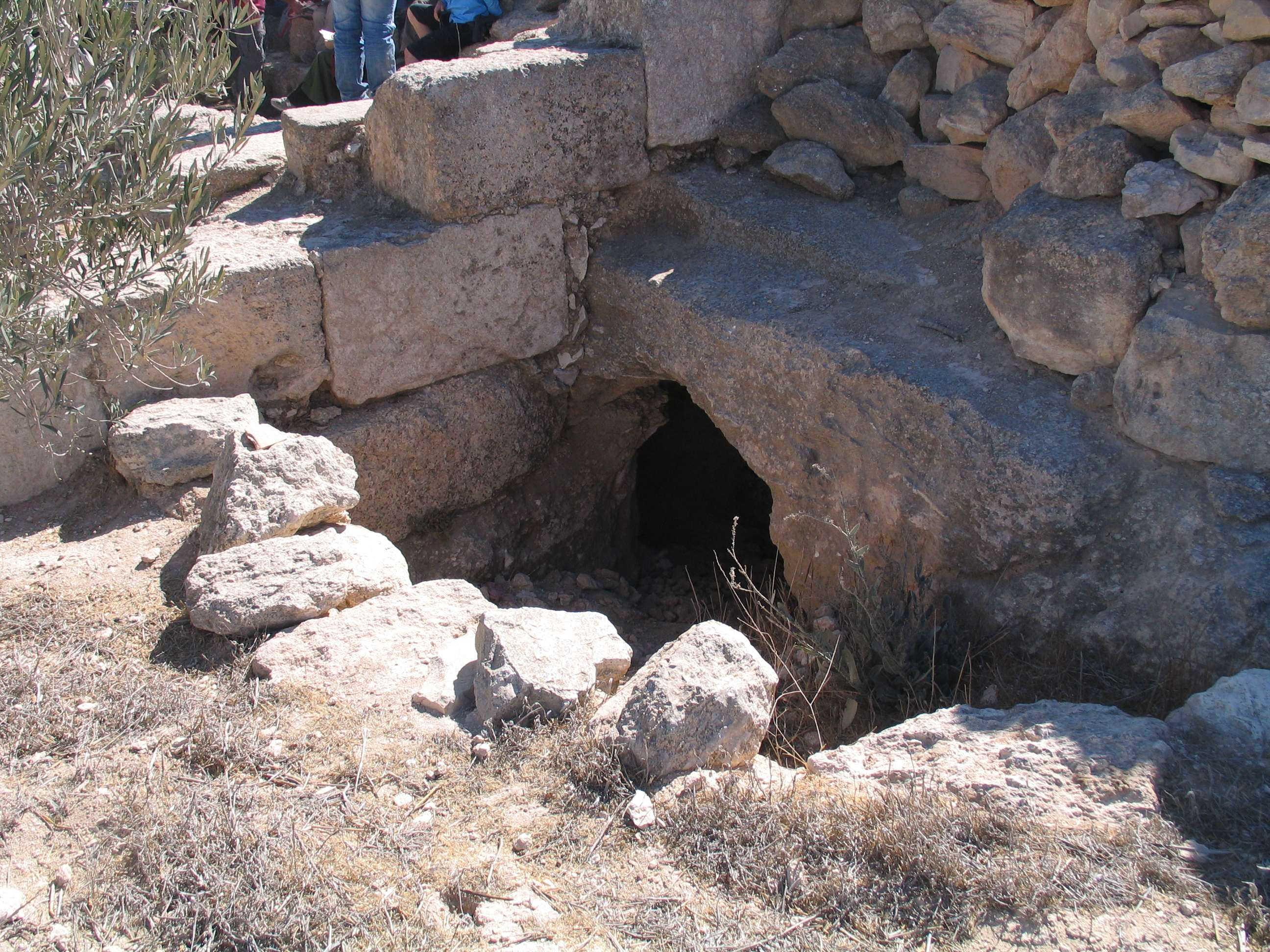
Ancient structures

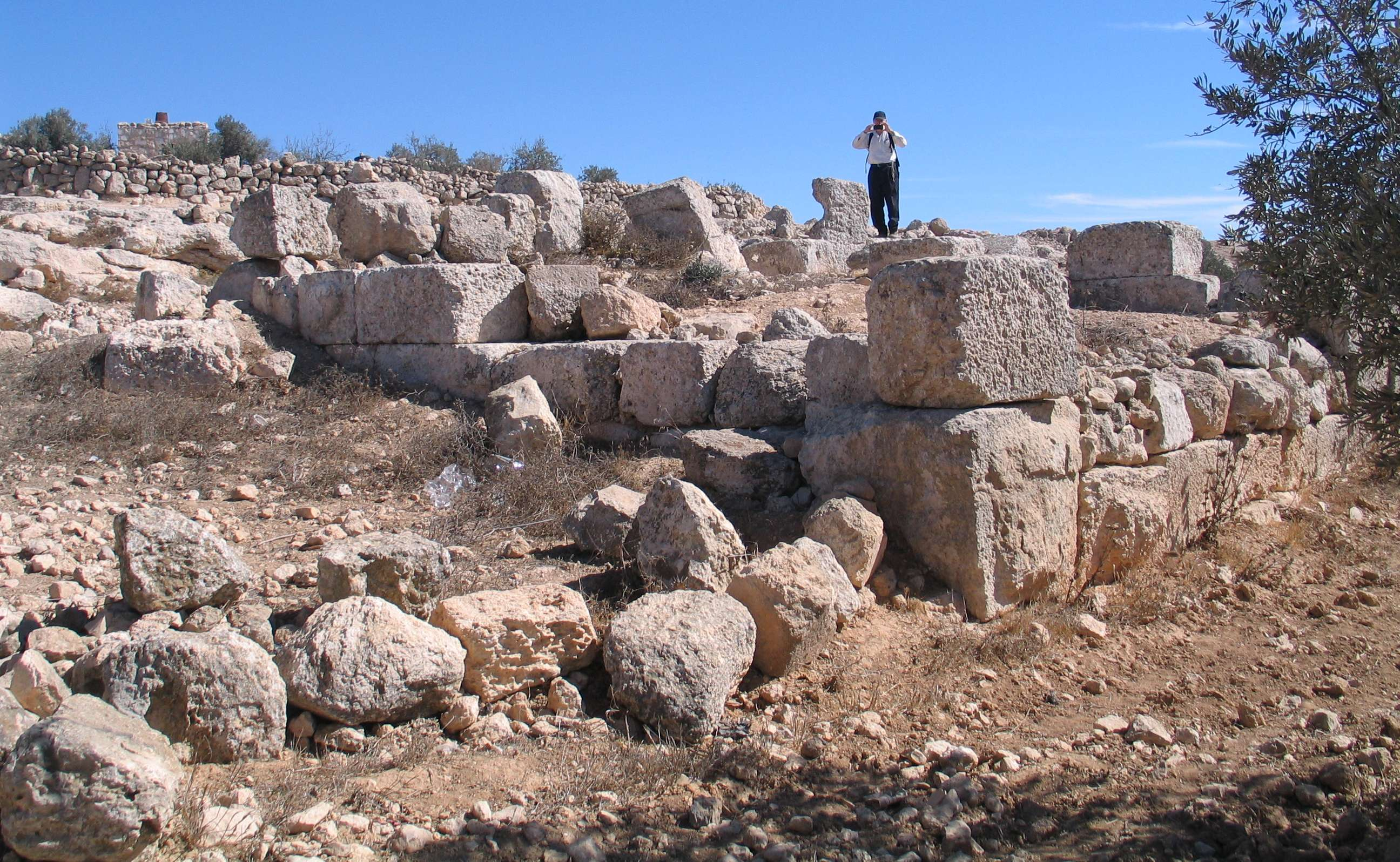
Ancient wall

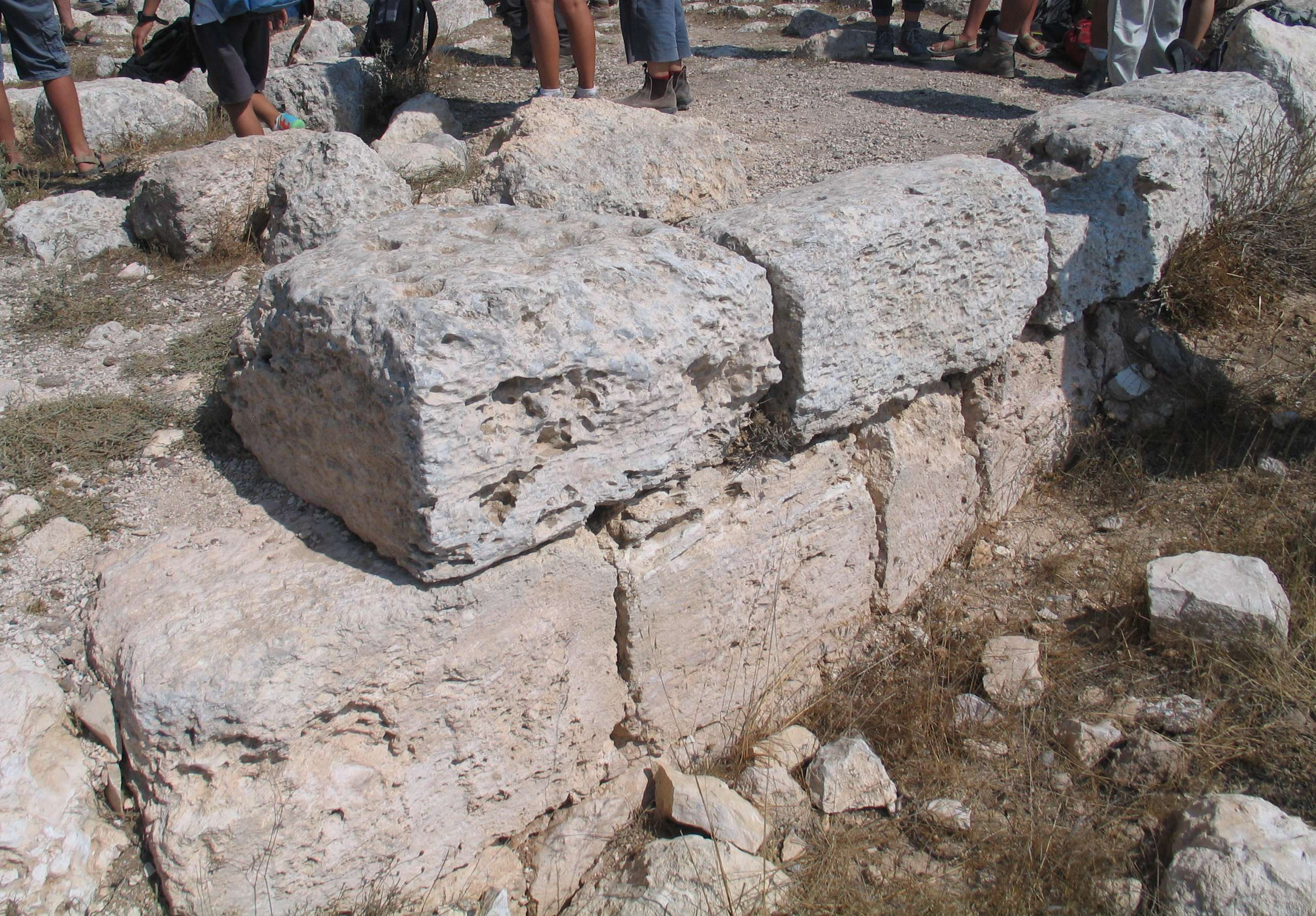
Remnants of Byzantine fort at Horvat Ma'on

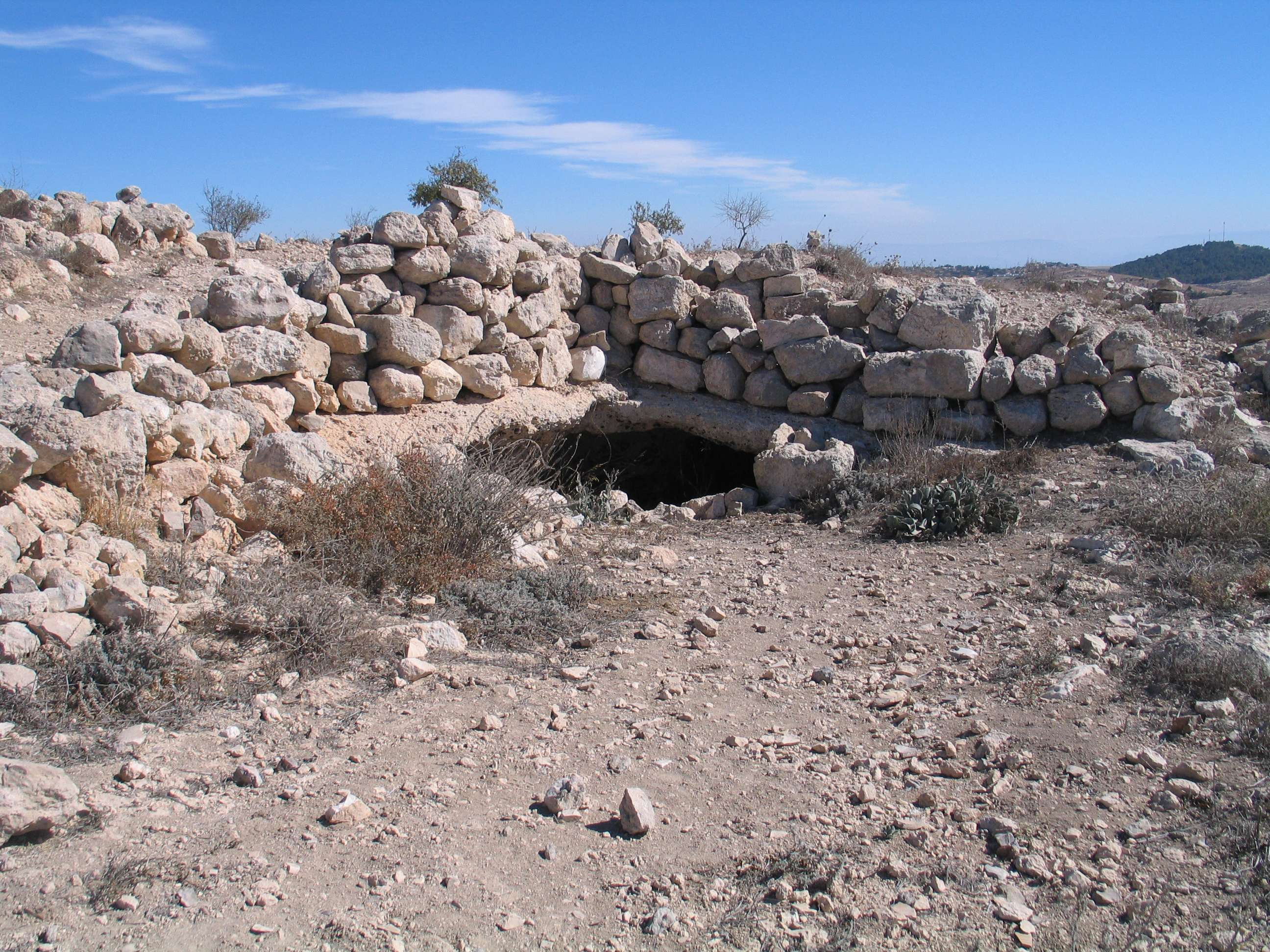
Detail

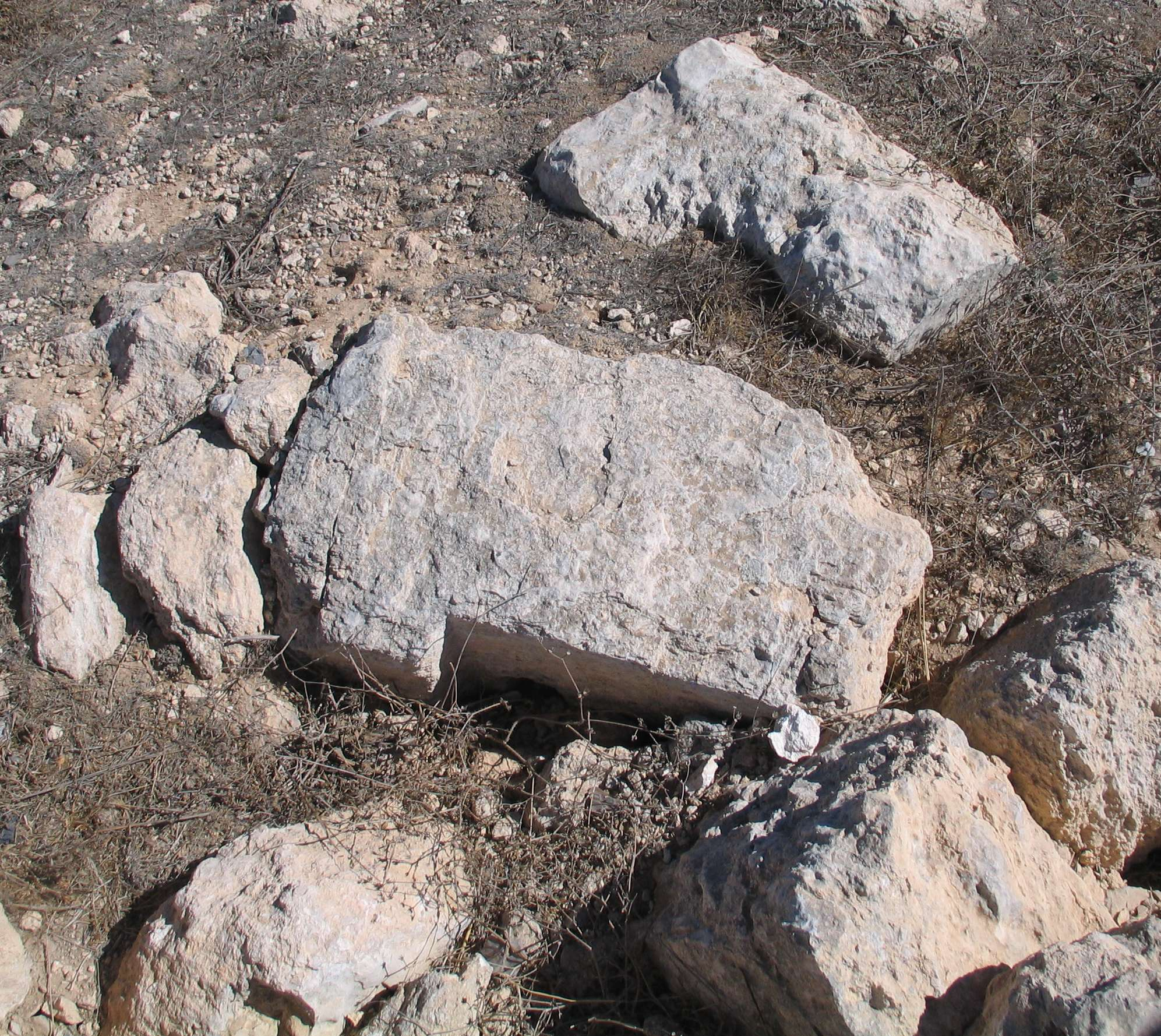
Ancient stones

== See also ==
- Ancient synagogues in the Palestine region - covers entire Palestine region/Land of Israel
  - Ancient synagogues in Israel - covers the modern State of Israel
- Ma'in, Hebron, small village located just north of the site
- Ma'on, Mount Hebron, Israeli settlement, c. 3 km east of the ancient site

== Bibliography ==
- Al-Muqaddasi (1994). The Best Divisions for Knowledge of the Regions. Translated by Basil Anthony Collins. Reading: Garnet Publishing. ISBN 1-873938-14-4.
- Amit, David (1978–1980). "Hurvat Ma'on". In Ben-Yosef, Sefi (ed.). מדריך ישראל: אנציקלופדיה שימושית לידיעת הארץ [Israel Guide - A useful encyclopedia for the knowledge of the land] (in Hebrew). Vol. 6: Yehudah ('Judaea'). Jerusalem: Keter Publishing House, in affiliation with the Israel Ministry of Defence. OCLC 745203905.
- Amit, David (1997). "A marble candelabrum from the synagogue of Maon in Judea". Judea and Samaria Research Studies (מחקרי יהודה ושומרון) (PDF) (in Hebrew). Vol. 7. Jerusalem: Israel Antiquities Authority. OCLC 741089250.
- Chapman III, Rupert L.; Taylor, J.E., eds. (2003). Palestine in the Fourth Century A.D.: The Onomasticon by Eusebius of Caesarea. Translated by G.S.P. Freeman-Grenville. Jerusalem: Carta. p. 72. ISBN 965-220-500-1. OCLC 937002750.
- Conder, C.R. (1879). Tent Work in Palestine. A Record of Discovery and Adventure. Vol. 2. London: Richard Bentley & Son (published for the Committee of the PEF). OCLC 23589738.
- Conder, C.R.; Kitchener, H.H. (1883). The Survey of Western Palestine: Memoirs of the Topography, Orography, Hydrography, and Archaeology. Vol. 3. London: Committee of the Palestine Exploration Fund.
- Dauphin, C. (1998). La Palestine byzantine, Peuplement et Populations. BAR International Series 726 (in French). Vol. III : Catalogue. Oxford: Archeopress. ISBN 0-860549-05-4.
- Freedman, D.N.; Myers, Allen C. (2000). Eerdmans Dictionary of the Bible. Amsterdam University Press. ISBN 978-90-5356-503-2.
- Guérin, Victor (1869). Description Géographique Historique et Archéologique de la Palestine (in French). Vol. 1: Judée, pt. 3. Paris: L'Imprimerie impériale.
- Seriy, Gregory; Nahshoni, Pirhiya (2004-05-31). "Horbat Ma'on". Hadashot Arkheologiyot – Excavations and Surveys in Israel (116).
