= Juttah =

Town mentioned in the Bible

Juttah (Hebrew: יוטה) was a biblical town in ancient Judah. According to the Hebrew Bible, the town was made a priestly city. It is identified with modern-day Yattah, which is located on a hill about 10 km south of Hebron on the West Bank, Palestine.

== Biblical relevance ==
=== Hebrew Bible ===
Juttah and its territorial periphery is listed as one of the 13 priestly, or Kohanic cities, part of the 48 Levitical cities, from the mountains or hill-country of Judah (Joshua 15:55; 21:16). Joshua places it in the neighborhood of Maon, Carmel, and Ziph.

=== Christianity ===
According to one tradition based on a verse from the Gospels (Luke 1:39), this was believed to have been the home of the parents of John the Baptist, Zechariah and Elizabeth, and therefore the birthplace of John the Baptist himself, prompting annual visits to Yatta by thousands of Greek Orthodox pilgrims at the end of the 19th century. In the 1920s, German cleric and biblical archaeologist, de:Andreas Evaristus Mader, also supported this identification.

== See also ==
- Ein Karem, another town identified since the Crusades as the birthplace of John the Baptist
