= Kfar Aziz =

Kfar 'Aziz: خربة عزيز; כפר עזיז; Khurbet 'Aziz
- Ruin
- Etymology: The Ruin of Aziz; "Strong Village"
- Location within Mandatory Palestine
- Coordinates: 31°25′50″N 35°04′57″E
- Palestine grid: 157/093
- Geopolitical entity: Mandatory Palestine
- Subdistrict: Hebron
- Date of demise: unknown
- Current Localities: Yatta, Hebron

Kfar Aziz (Hebrew: כפר עזיז) was a Jewish village from the period of the Mishnah. It is identified with Hurbat al Aziz, in the southern part of Yatta in the southern West Bank, lying at an elevation of 765 metres (2,510 ft) above sea level.

== Identification ==
The Mishnah tells the following story:

Once Rabbi Yehoshua went to Rabbi Yishmael in Kfar Aziz... and brought him up from there to Beit Hamaganiah...

Elsewhere in the Mishnah, it is stated that Rabbi Yishmael lived "near Edom". The Jerusalem Talmud explains as follows: "What does 'near Edom' mean? – To the south." These descriptions fit the southern Hebron Hills region, which is the southernmost part of the Holy Land before the desert, and the closest inhabited place to Edom.

== Archaeology ==
Lieut. H. H. Kitchener of the Palestine Exploration Fund visited the site in 1874 and gave a thorough description of its ruin and cave-like dwellings. Kitchener made note of the fact that the local people of Yatta village would go into the ruin and retrieve masonry from the old buildings on the site to be used in their own village construction.

At the start of the 20th-century, a large public building with pillars was found, apparently a church, indicating the presence of a Christian settlement in the region in the late Byzantine period. Olive and wine presses and ossuary fragments were found. Burial caves in the region indicated the presence of a Jewish settlement in the 2nd–3rd century, indicating a revival of Jewish life in the region after the Bar Kokhba revolt.

An archaeological survey at Hurbat al Aziz, conducted in 1968, revealed remains (mostly potsherds) from the Roman/Byzantine period, the era of the Mishnah. A reexamination of the public building replete with pillars led to the suggestion that it may have originally been a synagogue. No archaeological dig was performed (only a survey), and the exact period of the building is unknown.

Today, a modern Arab neighborhood has been built on the site, causing extensive damage to the ruins.

== Bibliography ==
- Conder, C.R.; Kitchener, H. H. (1883). The Survey of Western Palestine: Memoirs of the Topography, Orography, Hydrography, and Archaeology. Vol. 3. London: Committee of the Palestine Exploration Fund.
