= At-Tuwani =

Village in West Bank, Palestine

Tawani
- Place
- at-Tuwani

Arabic transcription(s)
  - Arabic: التواني
  - Latin: Tuwani (official)
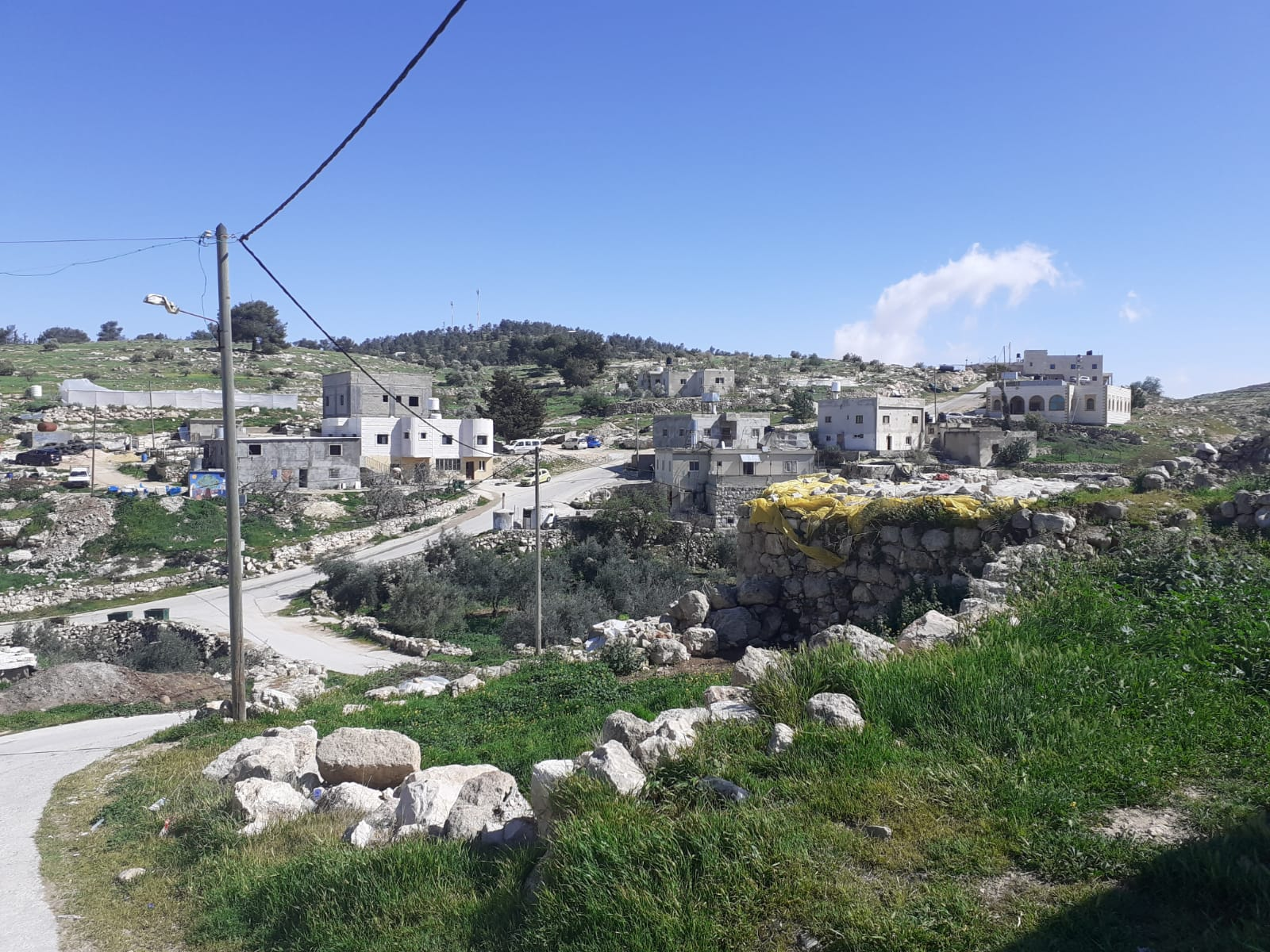
- Tawani

- Location of Tawani within Palestine Location of Tawani within the West Bank
- Coordinates: 31°24′51″N 35°09′11″E
- Palestine grid: 164/091
- State: Palestine
- Governorate: Hebron

Population (2017)
  - Total: 194
- Name meaning: "The ruin of delay"

Tawani or at-Tuwani (Arabic: التواني) is a Palestinian village in the south Hebron Hills of the Hebron Governorate. Many of the village's residents formerly lived in dwelling caves. The village is located south-east of the village of Yatta. Approximately one kilometre (0.62 miles) away lies Tel Tuwani, near the Israeli settlement of Ma’on. Frequent conflicts occur between at-Tawani's residents and settlers over Israeli encroachment on its land, roads and water resources. The village had a population of 194 residents in 2017.

== History ==
The village of Tawani is built on the ruins of Khirbet at-Tuwani. In an archeological survey conducted in 1968 several edifices, fences and pottery dated to the Byzantine era and Middle Ages. Most of the archeological findings were since removed. Today the village mainly consists of ancient houses from the Ottoman time, often build over the more ancient caves.

In 1838, Edward Robinson and noted At-Tawaneh as a ruin located southeast of el-Khulil. Tell Tuwaneh appears on Van de Velde's map of Palestine, charted in 1851-1852, and published in 1858.

In the 1870s Palestine Exploration Fund's Survey of Western Palestine, the place (named Khürbet Tûâny) was described as:

Foundations and walls; a circular masonry well, and rock-cut tombs now blocked. A lintel stone 6 feet (1.8 metres) long was found with a winged tablet on it. Near the ruin was a round olive-press, 7 feet (2.1 metres) diameter, 10 inches (250 mm) deep, with a rim 5 inches (130 mm) thick. It was cut in a sort of sunken platform of the live rock, with a socket for a pole or pillar in the centre of the press.

In the 19th century, many residents of the two big villages in the area of South Mount Hebron, Yatta and Dura, started to immigrate to ruins and caves in the area and became 'satellite villages' (daughters) to the mother town. Reasons for the expansion were lack of land for agriculture and construction in the mother towns which resulted in high prices of land, rivalry between the mother towns' hamulas wishing to control more land and resources, and being a security buffer, which made it more difficult for gangs of robbers to raid the mother villages. Caves are used by locals as residences, storage spaces and sheepfolds. The affiliation between the satellite villages and the mother town remained. While some of the satellites became permanent villages with communities of hundreds, others remained temporary settlements which served the shepherds and fallāḥīn for several months every year. In 1981-2 it was estimated 100-120 families dwelt in caves permanently in the South Mount Hebron region while 750-850 families lived there temporarily.

At-Tuwani had a population of 127 at the Jordanian census of 1961.

== Israeli occupation ==
After the Six-Day War in 1967, At-Tuwani has been under Israeli occupation. In a census conducted by Israel after it occupied the West Bank in the Six-Day War in 1967, the village was reported to have 175 residents in 33 households.

In 1994 a seven-member village council was established to administer the civil affairs of at-Tuwani and the nearby hamlets of Faqra and Tuba. At-Tuwani currently serves as the center of sorts for the two hamlets as well as for the 19 Bedouin localities of Masafer Yatta.

Under the Oslo Accords, this town was assigned to Area C, with political control and security responsibilities assigned to Israel.

=== Israeli settlement ===
In 1982, the settlement Ma'on was built on one side of the main road, the only viable road, between At-Tuwani and Tuba. In the late 1990s, Palestinians using the main road and other land nearby increasingly came under attack from violent settlers.

In 2001, settlers built the outpost Havat Ma'on (also named Hill 833 or Tel Abu Jundiya) on the other side of the road. By 2003, Palestinians stopped using the main road completely. Settlers from Ma'on fenced off private Palestinian lands by the road and now use the land for agricultural purposes.

In 2005/2006, the settlers expanded a chicken farm south of Hill 833. In 2008, the location was fenced, impeding vehicular traffic on the road. In 2009, new caravans were placed near Ma'on, on a slope north of the road and laid the foundations for 12 buildings. In March 2010, the settlers built houses in the new outpost.

=== Settler attacks ===
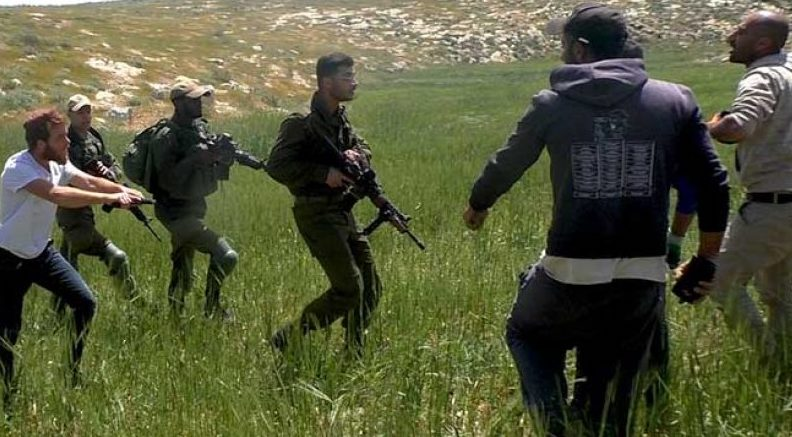
Armed Israeli settler accompanied by soldiers threatens Palestinian farmers near at-Tuwani, April 2020

Since 2004, the human rights groups Christian Peacemaker Teams and Operazione Colomba (Operation Dove) monitor the settler violence in the Hebron Governorate.

==== Attacks on shepherds and farmers ====
People in At-Tuwani and in the neighboring villages are mainly shepherds and farmers. They are often attacked by extremist violent Israeli settlers belonging to the national-religious movement. Christian Peacemaker Team members and Dove members have accompanied shepherds and farmers during their work to monitor settlers violence.

In 2004, it was reported that rotting chicken carcasses were found in a well at At-tuwani near Hebron in a suspected act of intentional well contamination by Israeli settlers.

In 2005, poison-covered barley was laid around Ma'on, where villagers usually graze their sheep and near one of At-Tuwani's water sources. Many animals – sheep, goats and wild fauna – were poisoned and died. The Israeli police refused to examine the poison. In February 2005, settlers from Havat Ma'on/Hill 833 attacked CPT and Dove members while accompanying shepherds and severely injured one of them.

In 2011, settlers from the outpost of Havat Ma'on attacked internationals and Palestinians five times within 30 days. On 13 July, three settler youth attacked Palestinian shepherds. On 18 July, 3 masked settlers armed with clubs attacked two shepherds and members of the At-Tuwani peace team.

During Israeli military training, Palestinian owned fields and crops are repeatedly damaged and destroyed.

In January 2019, 15 olive trees were cut down, and "Death to Arabs" was painted on stones, in an apparent price tag attack.

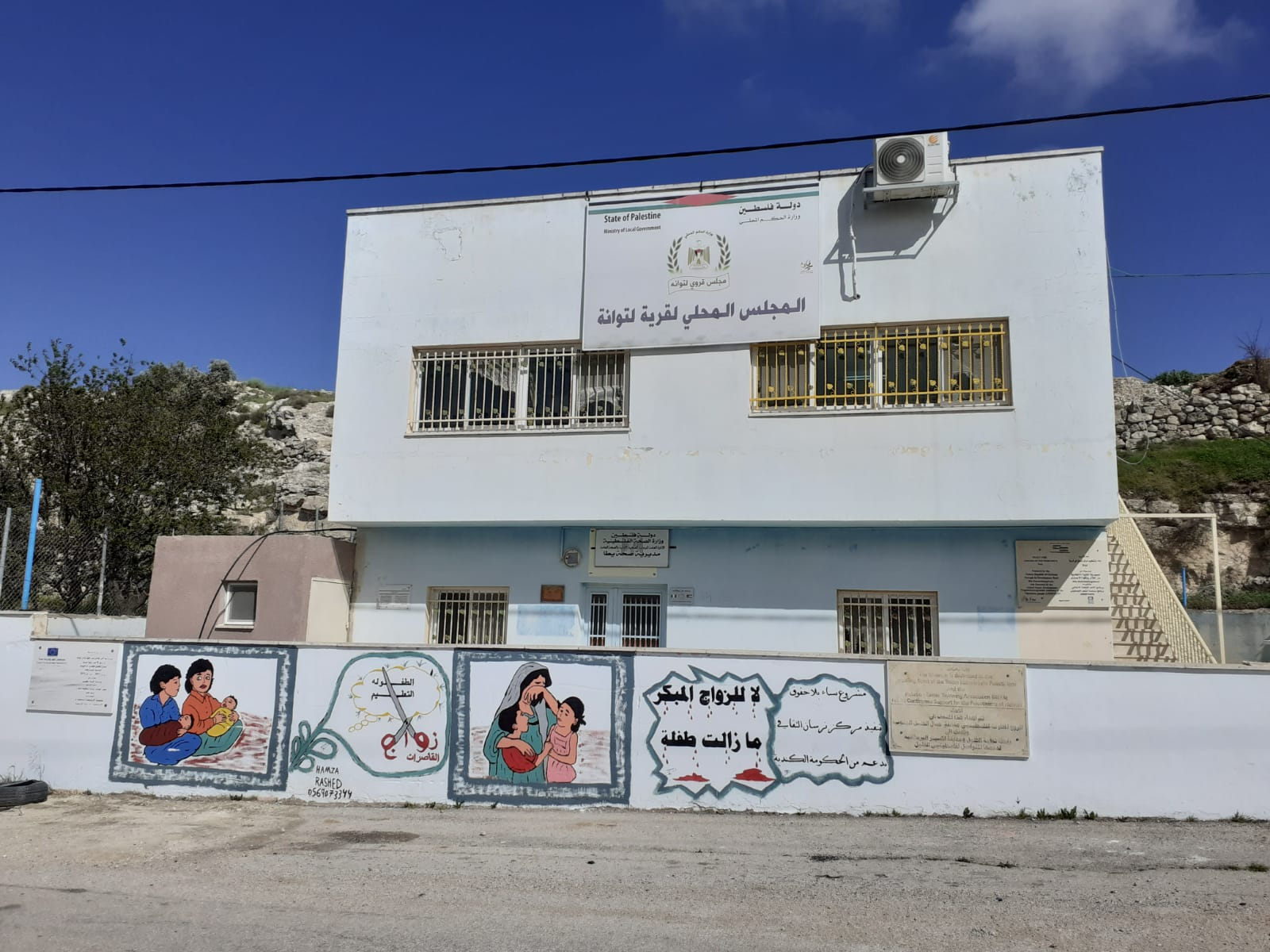
School in At-tuwani

== Health ==
In 2005 a clinic for the region's residents was built thanks to a European NGO; the clinic building also houses a museum commemorating non-violent resistance to the Israeli occupation in the region and a Media Lab for the youth. The Civil Administration didn't respond the many requests to build it, and declared the building illegal and stopped the construction work many times; in the end the Civil Administration issued a written document where stated the "future declaration of the construction permit". Today, a doctor is present at the clinic once a week. Many people from the villages located south of At-Tuwani use this service, since the closest hospital is distant 10 kilometres (6.2 miles) and often there is a military check-point along the road.

== Water ==
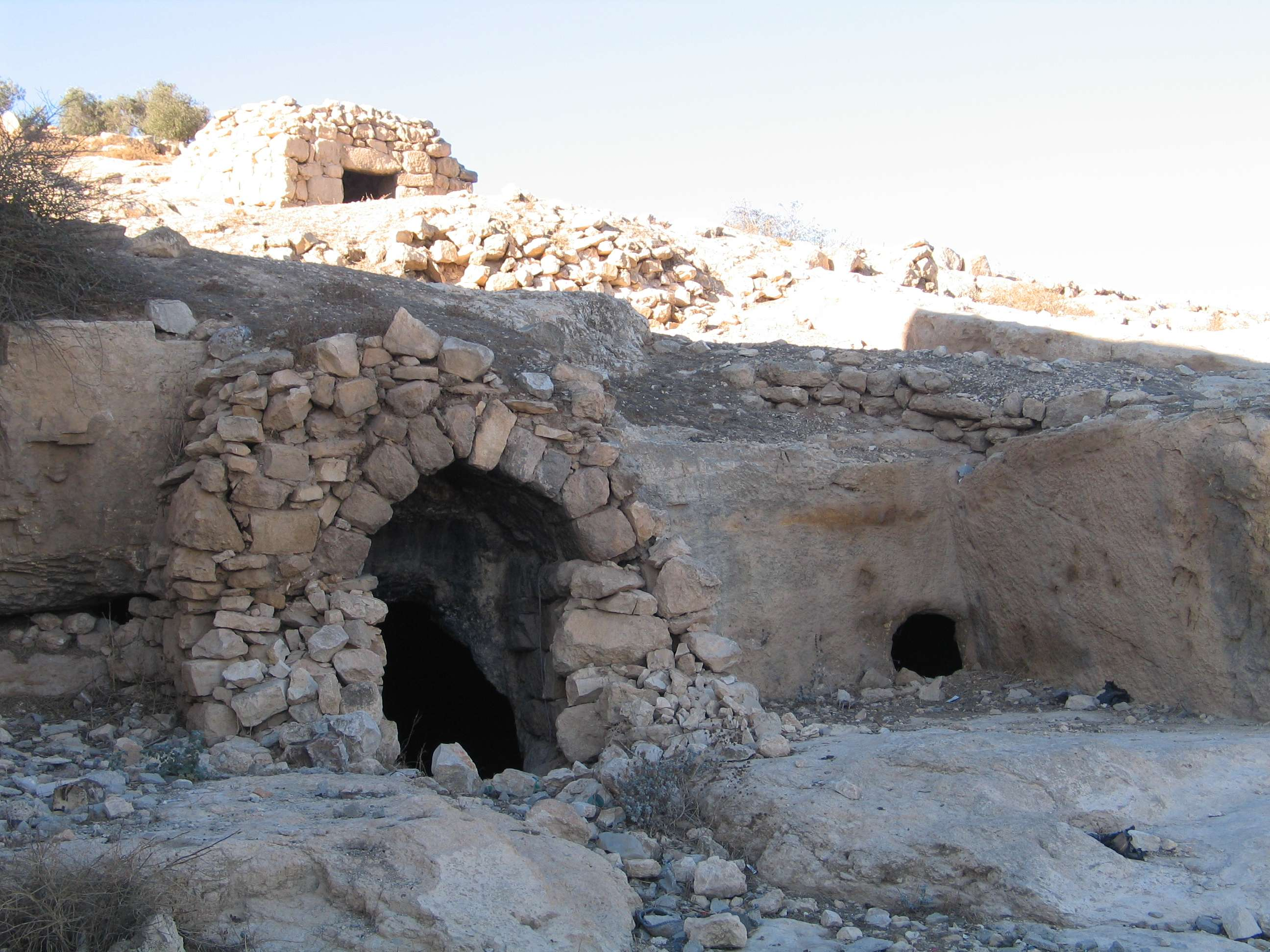
Cave houses in at-Tawani

As of February 2011 there is no running water in the village of at-Tawani, while Israeli settlements and outposts are connected to the Israeli water system. At-Tawani's residents frequently petition the Israeli military administration and the Israeli Civil Administration, as well as the Israeli Water Commission to supply them with the necessary infrastructure.

The Association for Civil Rights in Israel and Bimkom – Planners for Planning Rights Association have recently joined the residents' efforts by petitioning Deputy Minister of Defense, Matan Vilnai, to connect the village to running water. The village is located in Area C (under the Oslo Accords) and is thus subject to Israeli jurisdiction for all civilian matters. Israeli Parliament (Knesset) Members Haim Oron (of Meretz party) and Dov Khenin (of Hadash party) committed to petitioning the Ministry of Defense regarding connecting the village to running water. About two months later, In July 2010, the Civil Administration announced the village is going to be connected to running water.

In addition to lacking water infrastructure and running water, At-Tawani residents suffer from infringements concerning their rights to shelter. Most of the residents' houses and lands are not included in the Israeli Civil Administration's master plan for the region, submitted for authorization (yet to be legally endorsed). Several residents have submitted their objection to this plan, and in 2004 were struggling to prevent their homes from being demolished on their lands, after villagers' houses have been demolished in the past.

According to David Hirst, the inhabitants of al-Amniyr, at-Tawani and the other villages that comprise Susya are faced with a "catch-22" situation: if they comply with the law, they cannot build cisterns and collect even the rainwater; but if they fail to work their lands, they lose the lands to the Israeli government.

== Bibliography ==
- Conder, C.R.; Kitchener, H.H. (1883). The Survey of Western Palestine: Memoirs of the Topography, Orography, Hydrography, and Archaeology. Vol. 3. London: Committee of the Palestine Exploration Fund.
- Dauphin, C. (1998). La Palestine byzantine, Peuplement et Populations. BAR International Series 726 (in French). Vol. III : Catalogue. Oxford: Archeopress. ISBN 0-860549-05-4.
- Government of Jordan, Department of Statistics (1964). First Census of Population and Housing. Volume I: Final Tables; General Characteristics of the Population (PDF).
- Palmer, E.H. (1881). The Survey of Western Palestine: Arabic and English Name Lists Collected During the Survey by Lieutenants Conder and Kitchener, R. E. Transliterated and Explained by E.H. Palmer. Committee of the Palestine Exploration Fund.
