= Ma'on, Har Hevron =

Israeli settlement in the West Bank

Ma'on: מָעוֹן (Hebrew)
- Moshav shitufi
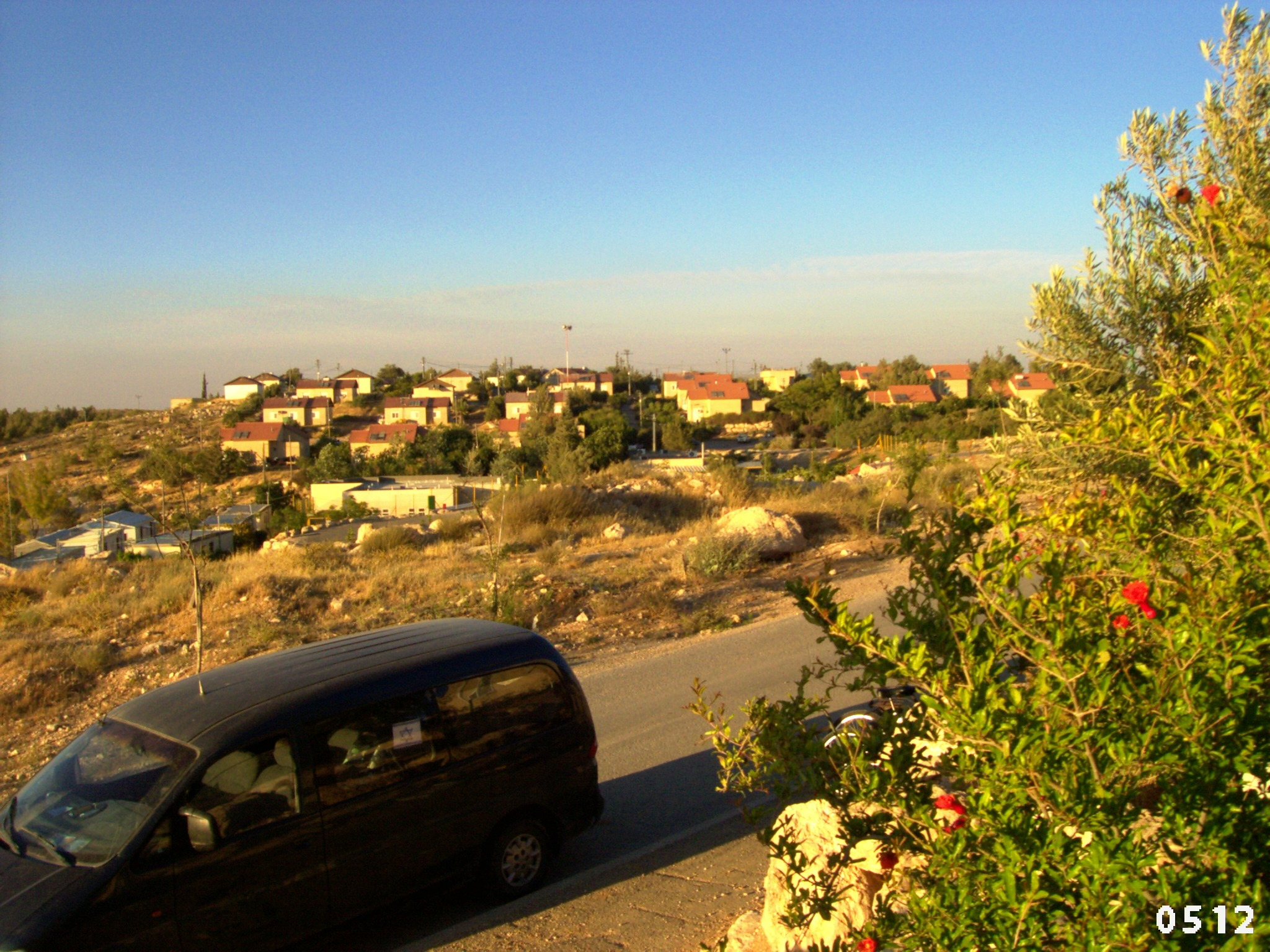
- Ma'on Settlement

- Location within the Southern West Bank
- Coordinates: 31°24′48″N 35°09′50″E
- Country: Palestine
- District: Judea and Samaria Area
- Council: Har Hebron
- Region: West Bank
- Affiliation: Amana
- Founded: 1981
- Founder: Nahal
- Population (2024): 769

Ma'on (Hebrew: מָעוֹן) is an Israeli settlement organized as a moshav shitufi in the West Bank. Located in the Judean Hills south of Hebron and north of Beersheba, it falls under the jurisdiction of Har Hevron Regional Council. In 2024, it had a population of 769.

The international community considers Israeli settlements in the West Bank illegal under international law, but the Israeli government disputes this.

== Etymology ==
The word 'Ma'on' in Hebrew means 'dwelling'. It refers to a biblical village said to stand on the borderlands of the desert, in the highlands of Judah, which is mentioned in Joshua 15:55, identified in modern times with Khirbet Ma'in, about 3 km to the west.

== Geography ==
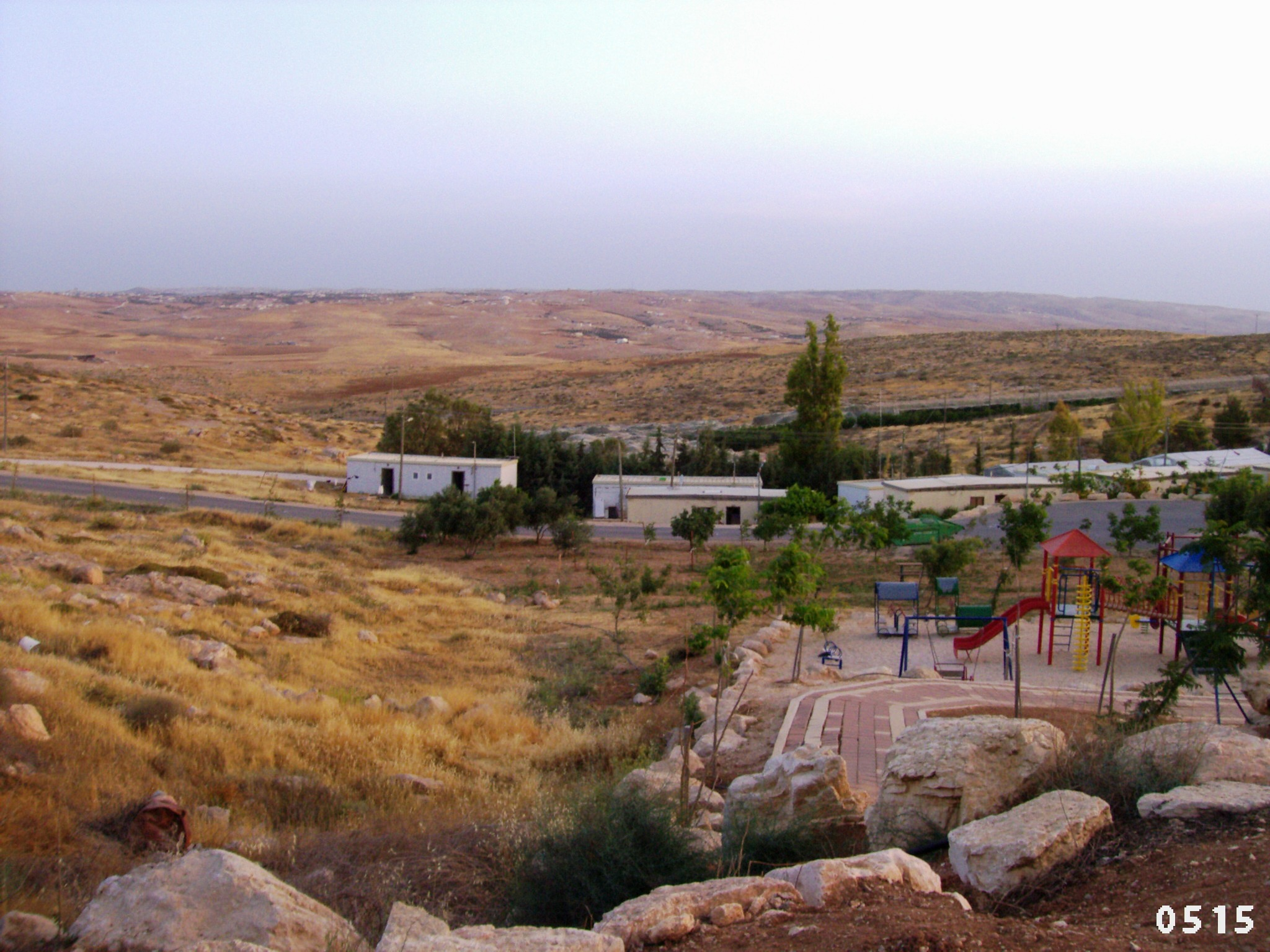
View towards Har Hevron

Ma'on is located in the southern Judean Hills at about 863 m above sea level.

== History ==
=== Biblical and classical Maon ===
According to the 4th-century Onomasticon, ancient Maon was in the region of Daroma.

=== Arab village of Ma'in ===
The Arab village of Ma'in stood on a conical hill, 1.25 kilometres south of Carmel, and 3 kilometres east of Susiya, with the ruins of a "castle" and cisterns still seen by Edward Robinson in the 19th century, lying about 9 Roman miles south-south-east of Hebron.

=== Israeli outpost; expansion ===
The Israeli outpost was first established in 1981 as a paramilitary Nahal outpost. It is located on one side of the main road between At-Tuwani and Tuba, east of At-Tuwani. The first civilian population, members of the Orthodox Zionist youth movement Bnei Akiva, settled there in 1982.

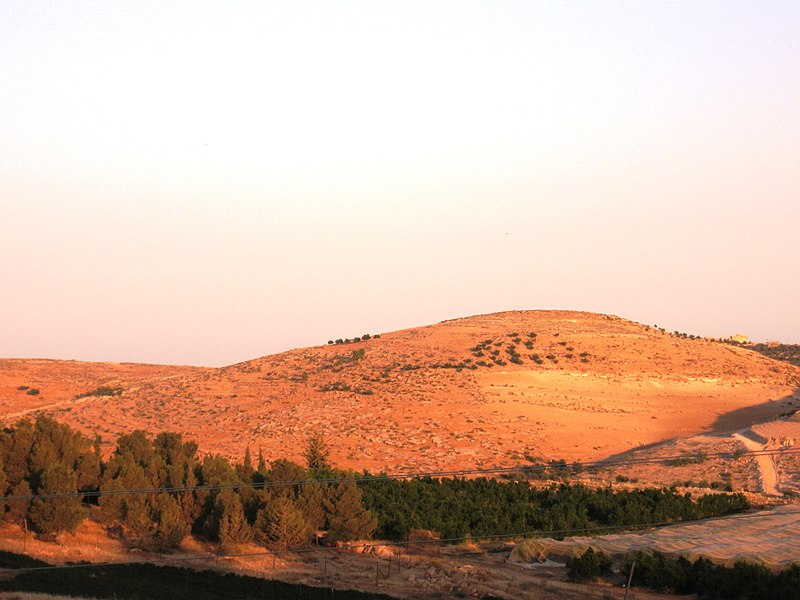
Tell Ma'on near Hebron

In 2001, Israeli settlers established the outpost Havat Ma'on (also named Hill 833 or Tel Abu Jundiya) on the other side of the main road, appropriating privately owned Palestinian land. According to a local Palestinian, by setting up the illegal outpost, the road from the nearby village of Tuba to At-Tuwani was cut off. The effect on Palestinian children attending school, who were subject to frequent stoning from the residents of Havat Maon, was to constrain them to abandon the short road to take a detour that increased the distance to school from 3 to 20 kilometers. In 2003, settlers took over Palestinian land near the road, which was abandoned due to ongoing settlers attacks; on 25 December, several new outposts were set up. The Palestinian children were protected from harassment first by a group from Christian Peacemaker Team and then the Israeli army, which however has a record of turning up late.

In 2005/2006, the settlers expanded a chicken farm south of Hill 833. In 2008, the location was fenced, impeding vehicular traffic on the road. In 2009, new caravans were placed near Ma'on, on a slope north of the road and laid the foundations for 12 buildings. In March 2010, the settlers built houses in the new outpost.

== Israeli settler violence ==
In the late 1990s, Palestinians using the road between Ma'on and Hill 833 increasingly came under attack from hostile settlers. Eventually, the Palestinians were forced to abandon their use of the road and nearby lands. In 2010, United Nations OCHA reported frequent attacks by settlers from the Ma'on outpost on schoolchildren who used the road.

In 2011, Christian Peacemaker Teams reported 5 attacks by settlers from the outpost Havat Ma'on on internationals and Palestinians within 30 days. On 13 July, three settler youth attacked Palestinian shepherds. On 18 July 3 masked settlers armed with clubs attacked two shepherds and members of the At-Tuwani peace team. In July 2012, Operazione Colomba reported an attack by masked settlers on a child and volunteers of "Operation Dove". In January 2014, settlers threatened shepherds. At the end, the army arrested a shepherd. The following days, Israeli soldiers chased shepherds in the same area. In November 2014, the Israeli army was still escorting schoolchildren from Tubas to school in At-Tuwani and home, with no plans to cancel the twice daily escort, because of the risk of settler attacks.

On March 10, 2021, five Palestinian children (aged 9 to 13) were in the fields around Ma'on picking wild 'Aqub to sell in their village when settlers accused the children of trespass, causing Israeli police and military to arrest, interrogate, and temporarily detain the children, three of whom were below the minimum age of legal responsibility.

== Agriculture ==
Ma'on and the nearby settlement Carmel jointly operate a dairy with about four hundred cows. The average daily production per head is about 38 liters of milk.

According to The New York Times, the settlers of Ma'on "luxuriates in water piped in by the Israeli authorities" while the nearby Palestinian locality of Tuba "struggles to collect rainwater".

The settlement and its residents are working as a teachers, social workers, farmers, and has also a local winery. The residents of Havat Ma'on but also those from Ma'on itself are mostly working in agriculture, raising sheep, chickens and cows and working as a shepherd, as well as farming grapes, cherries, tomatoes, potatoes, almonds, wheat and olives.

== Notable people ==
- Udi Davidi, Israeli singer, musician, lyricist and composer who lives on a farm in Ma'on raising sheep and composing music.
