= Nabal =

Biblical figure

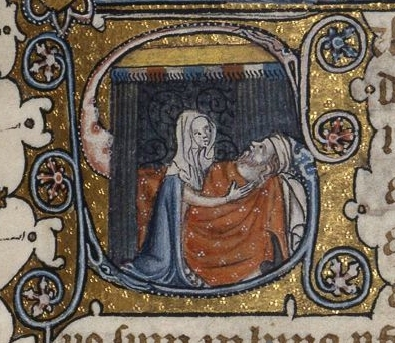
14th-century depiction of Abigail tending Nabal.

According to the 1st Book of Samuel Chapter 25, Nabal (Hebrew: נָבָל Nāḇāl, "villain") was a rich Calebite, described as harsh and surly. He is featured in a story in which he is threatened by David over an insult, and ultimately killed by God.

== Biblical narrative ==
According to the Biblical narrative, David (not yet king) and his band of men, who had been fleeing from King Saul, went to the Wilderness of Paran.

The account states that Nabal lived in the city of Maon, and owned much land in the town of Carmel, as well as many sheep and goats. The episode takes place at the time of sheep-shearing, which in Israelite culture was a time for great festivities, owing to the importance of the wool trade. At this time David sent ten men to Nabal. David told his men to remind Nabal that his men had not harmed or robbed Nabal's shepherds, and requested that Nabal give him whatever provisions were on hand. David's request is couched in language that refers to David's men as Nabal's servants, and to David himself as Nabal's "son".

Nabal harshly rebuffs David's request: "Who is David? And who is the son of Jesse? There are many servants these days that break away every man from his master; shall I then take my bread, and my water, and my meat that I have killed for my shearers, and give it unto men of whom I know not whence they are?"

Upon hearing Nabal's response, David and four hundred of his men arm themselves with swords.

One of Nabal's shepherds, considering Nabal too abrasive to approach about the issue, warns Nabal's wife, Abigail, of the situation, giving a positive account of his previous experiences with David and his men.

Abigail chose to intervene in order to avert David's wrath. In the account, while David armed his men and set off with 400 of them for Nabal's home, leaving 200 men behind to look after the supplies, Abigail set off with her servants and a very large quantity of provisions, without telling Nabal.

Abigail manages to meet David and his men before David reaches Nabal, and she pleads for David to accept the gifts she has brought with her, and begs that there be no bloodshed, asking to take Nabal's blame herself, and complimenting David by stating that Yahweh would make his dynasty long-lasting, and David sinless and divinely protected; as a result of her actions, David recognizes that he is about to sin and calls off his threat and sends Abigail home in peace. Abigail does not tell Nabal about what she has done until the following day as, when she returns, Nabal is drunk and high-spirited due to a kingly banquet, but when she does tell Nabal he has a heart-attack, or possibly a stroke, and dies ten days later. The account ends with David hearing about the death, recognizing that it was a punishment from Yahweh, and asking for (and receiving) the hand of Abigail in marriage.

== Abigail's character ==
Abigail is described in the account as being beautiful and intelligent, and the aggadah treats Abigail as being one of the four most beautiful women in Jewish history (the other three being Sarah, Rahab, and Esther); in the aggadah it is claimed that David nearly fell in love with her while she was still the wife of Nabal, but Abigail's moral strength and dignity prevented any liaisons, although she is also criticized for stating remember your handmaid, as in the agaddah's view this was unbecoming of a married woman.

== Textual features and origin ==
The root meaning of the name Nabal is wilt, and came to mean failure, and so gained the figurative meaning of being shamelessly improprietous; in the Nabal narrative, he is described as living up to his name, in addition to being surly and mean. Traditionally Nabal is euphemistically translated as fool, for which a Hebrew synonym is kesil (literally meaning fool); scholars regard it as possible that some features of the Nabal narrative derive from primitive mythology, and it is notable that kesil particularly referred to the constellation of Orion, and was translated as Orion by the Septuagint.

Nabal (נבל) may be a deliberate satirical corruption of the name Nadab (נדב); if this is an eponym then it probably referred originally to Jehonadab (which is just a theophory of nadab), and thus represent the Rechabites. In the genealogical lists of the Books of Chronicles, there is a man named Nadab, whose brother is married to a person named Abihail; it is possible that the name Abigail (אבגיִל) is a corruption of Abihail (אֲביִהיִל), so that it more closely describes the character of the wife, since Abigail roughly means joy of my father, suggesting positive characteristics, while Abihail means only my father is strength. Rather than the name of his wife was Abigail (שׁם אִשׁתּוֹ אבגיִל) the account in the Books of Samuel may have originally read the name of the chief of Abihail (שׁם שר אביהיִל), and told of a clan named Abihail, which left a political alliance with the Rechabites (represented by Nabal/Nadab) to join the Kingdom of Judah (represented by David's band of men).

Textual scholars ascribe this narrative to the republican source of the Books of Samuel (named this due to its generally negative presentation of David and Saul); the rival source, known as the monarchial source, does not at first glance appear to contain a similar narrative. The same narrative position is occupied in the monarchial source by the story of a raid by Amalekites on the town of Ziklag, and the subsequent defeat of the Amalekites by David. There are some similarities between the narratives: the fact that Ziklag and Maon are located in the region south of Hebron; David leading an army in revenge (for the Amalekite's destruction of Ziklag and capture of its population), with 400 of the army going ahead and 200 staying behind; David gaining Abigail as a wife (though in the Ziklag narrative he re-gains her), as well as several provisions; and there being a jovial feast in the enemy camp (i.e. Nabal's property). However, there are also several differences: such as the victory and provisions being obtained by a heroic victory by David rather than Abigail's peaceful actions; the 200 that stayed behind doing so due to exhaustion rather than to protect the baggage; the main secondary character being the former slave of the enemy, rather than the wife of the enemy (Nabal); David's forces rejoining their wives rather than being joined by damsels; and the Amalekites rather than Nabal being the enemy.
