= Carmel (biblical settlement) =

Biblical settlement

Carmel خربة الكرمل Arabic כרמל Hebrew
- Village
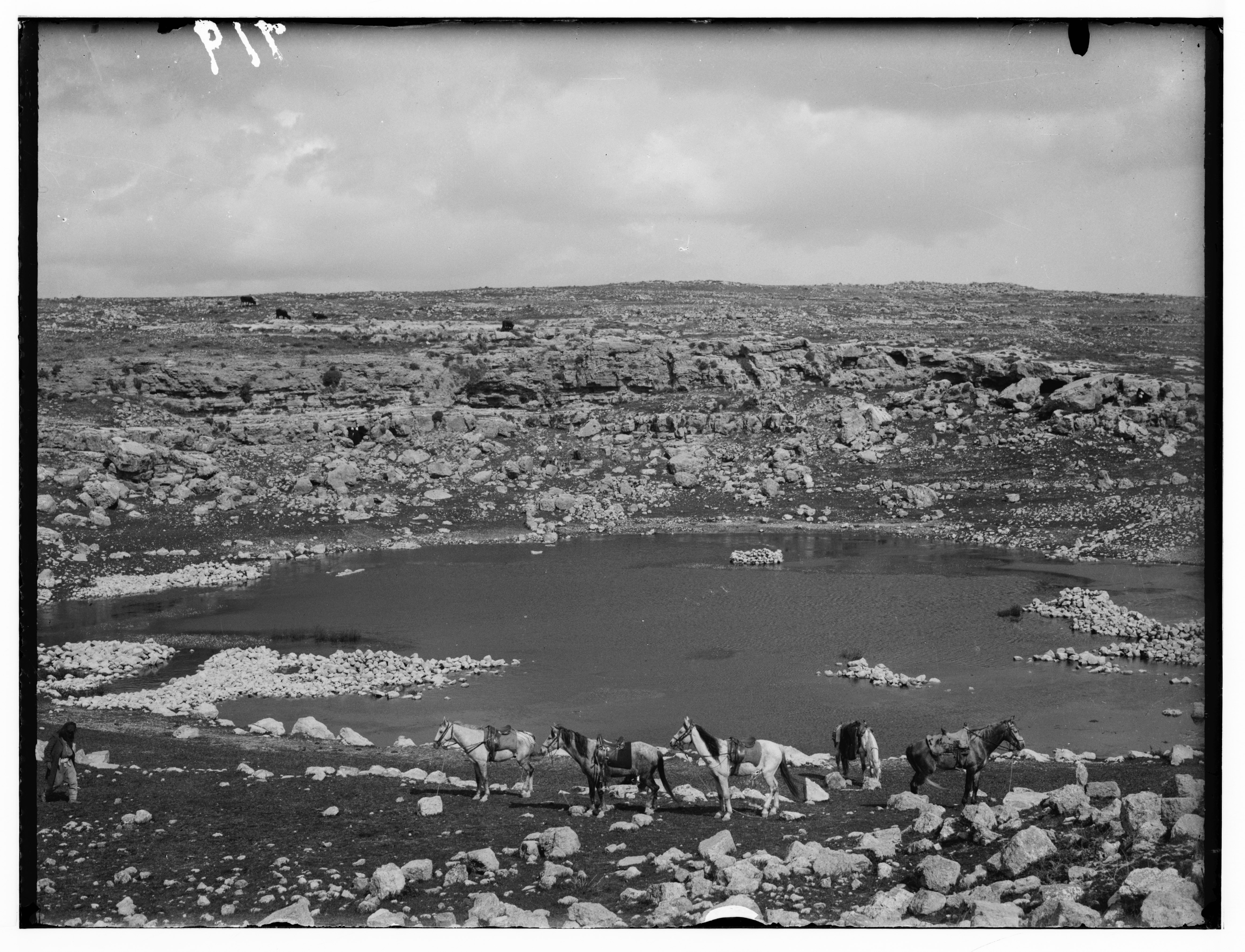
- Library of Congress photograph of Carmel circa 1900 to 1926, showing run-off from natural spring

- Location of Karmil
- Coordinates: 31°25′25″N 35°07′59″E
- Region: West Bank
- District: Judea and Samaria Area

Government
  - Council: Har Hevron (Mount Hebron) Regional Council
- Time zone: UTC+2 (IST)
  - Summer (DST): UTC+3 (IDT)

Carmel was an ancient Israelite town in Judea, lying about 11.2 kilometres (7.0 mi) from Hebron, on the southeastern frontier of Mount Hebron. According to the Bible, Saul erected a victory monument in Carmel to memorialize his triumph over Amalek.

The site is generally identified with the Arab village of al-Karmil.

== In the Hebrew Bible ==
There are several references to Carmel in the Bible. Carmel is mentioned as a city of Judah in the Books of Samuel and also in Joshua 15:55. It is mentioned as the place where Saul erects a monument after the expedition against the Amalekites (1 Samuel 15:12). Carmel is mentioned in 1 Samuel 25:2 as the place of Nabal's possessions, who was the husband of Abigail.

Beside the agricultural importance of the site, Carmel had also a strategic importance because of it containing the only reliable natural spring of water in the immediate area, which waters are collected in a man-made pool. Carmel, in relation to Maon, lies directly to its north, within close proximity.

== Roman and Byzantine period ==
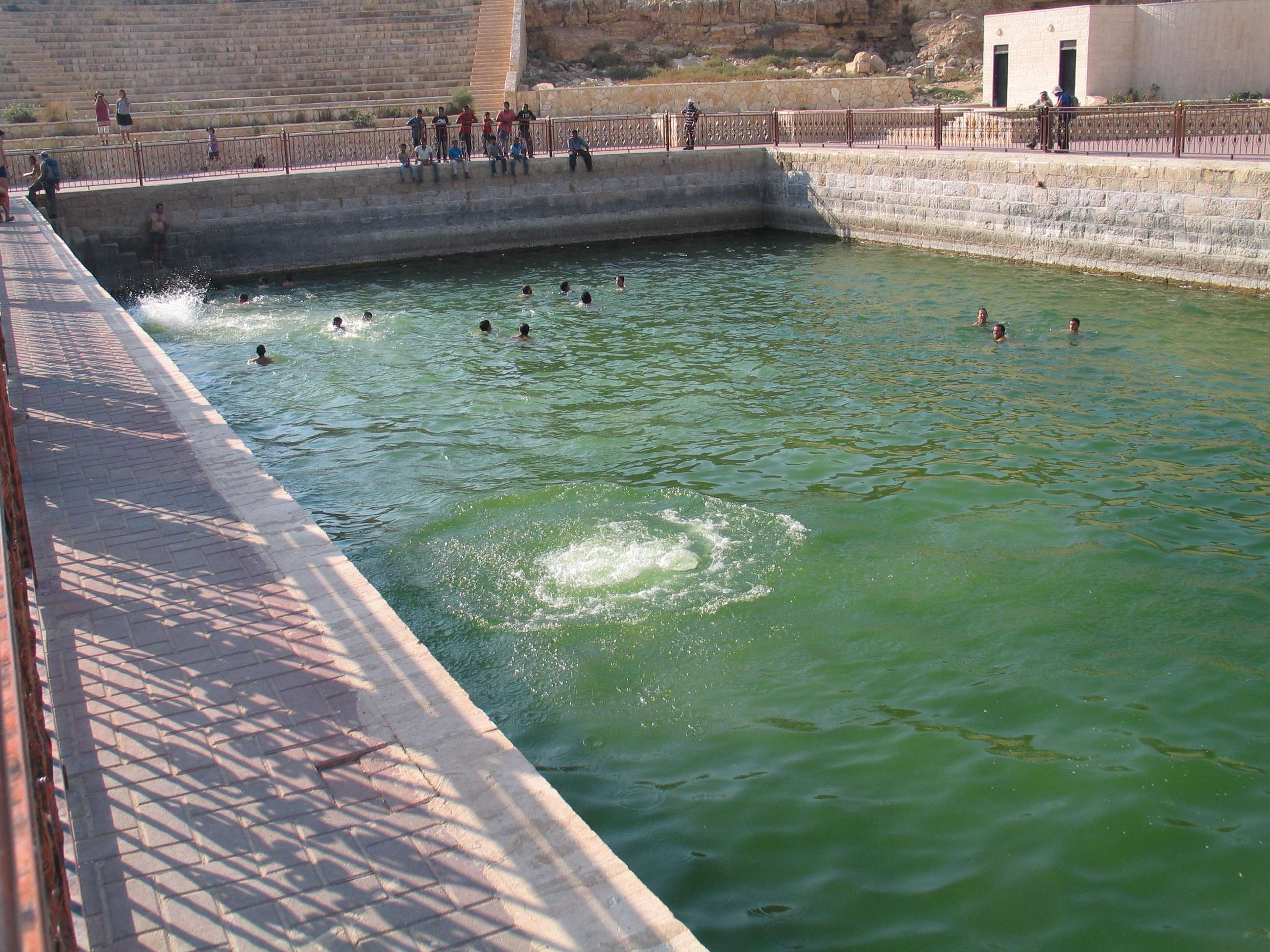
Man-made pool at Carmel (al-Karmil)

Mentioned in Eusebius' Onomasticon as a village "10 milestones east [sic] of Hebron," the village housed a Roman garrison after the Bar Kochba revolt. The Jewish settlement is thought to have prospered until the Persian army of Chosroes forced the Roman garrison of Heraclius' army to leave Palestine. With a lack of market for their wine, the Jewish settlement declined, with the synagogue finally being abandoned in the 9th century.

In the Byzantine Empire era, around the 6th or 7th century CE, a church was built here, on the western side of the remains. Outlines of a further two churches were uncovered to the immediate north and south.

The abandoned synagogue, which still stands in the Palestinian town now known as al-Karmil, is one of the best preserved ancient synagogues in the West Bank.

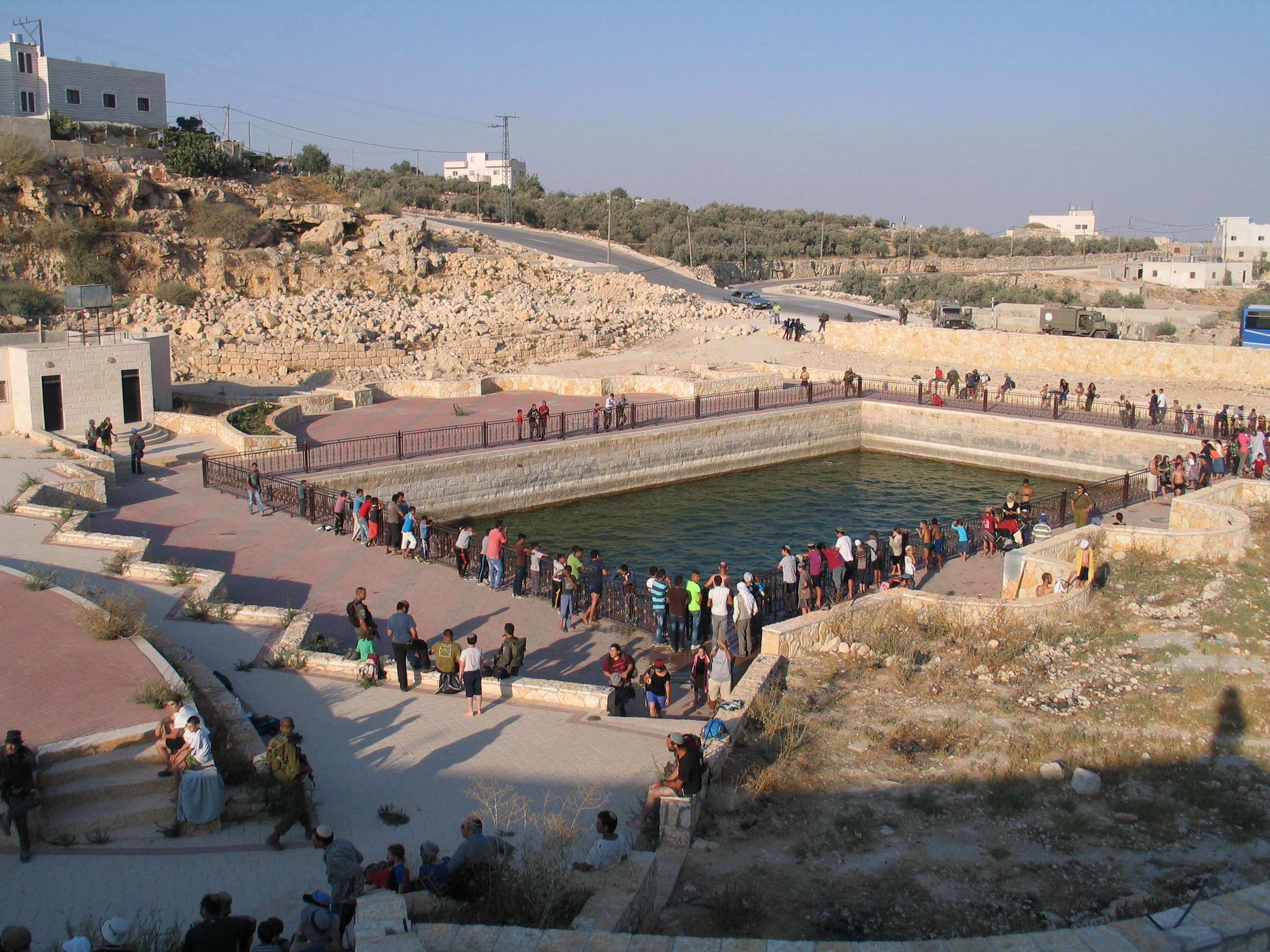
Man-made pool at Carmel (al-Karmil)

== Crusader period ==
During the period of the Crusades in the 12-century CE, a castle was built at Carmel under the command of Renaud of Châtillon. William of Tyre mentions Carmel as the camp of King Amalric in 1172.

== Bibliography ==
- Amit, David (n.d.). "Khirbet al-Karmil". In Ben-Yosef, Sefi (ed.). Israel Guide - Judaea (A useful encyclopedia for the knowledge of the country) (in Hebrew). Vol. 9. Jerusalem: Keter Publishing House, in affiliation with the Israel Ministry of Defence. OCLC 745203905.
- Bar, Doron (2003). "The Christianisation of Rural Palestine during Late Antiquity". Journal of Ecclesiastical History. 54 (3). Cambridge University Press: 401–421. doi:10.1017/S0022046903007309.
- Chapman III, Rupert L.; Taylor, J.E., eds. (2003). Palestine in the Fourth Century A.D.: The Onomasticon by Eusebius of Caesarea. Translated by G.S.P. Freeman-Grenville. Jerusalem: Carta. ISBN 965-220-500-1. OCLC 937002750.
- Conder, C.R.; Kitchener, H.H. (1883). The Survey of Western Palestine: Memoirs of the Topography, Orography, Hydrography, and Archaeology. Vol. 3. London: Committee of the Palestine Exploration Fund.
- Ellenblum, R. (2007). Crusader Castles and Modern Histories. Cambridge University Press. pp. 108, 254, 309. ISBN 978-0-521-86083-3.
- Epiphanius (1935). James Elmer Dean (ed.). Epiphanius' Treatise on Weights and Measures - The Syriac Version. Chicago: University of Chicago Press. OCLC 123314338.
- Kuhnen, H-P., Studien zur Chronologie und Siedlungsarchaologie des Karmel (Israel) zwischen Hellenismus und Spatantike (Wiesbaden, 1989).
- Lozovyy, Joseph. (2006). Saul, Doeg, Nabal and the "Son of Jesse": Readings in 1 Samuel 16-25. Ph.D. Thesis at the University of Edinburgh
- Mader, Andreas (1918). Altchristliche Basiliken und Lokaltraditionen in Südjudäa. Archäologische und topographische Untersuchungen (in German). Paderborn: F. Schöningh.
- Murphy-O'Connor, J. (2008). The Holy Land: An Oxford Archaeological Guide from Earliest Times to 1700. Oxford University Press US. ISBN 978-0-19-923666-4.
- Pringle, Denys (1997). Secular buildings in the Crusader Kingdom of Jerusalem: an archaeological Gazetteer. Cambridge University Press. ISBN 0521-46010-7.
- Rey, E.G. (Emmanuel Guillaume) [in French] (1871). Etude sur les monuments de l'architecture militaire des croisés en Syrie et dans l'île de Chypre (in French). Paris: L'Imprimerie Nationale.
