= Yatta, Hebron =

City in Hebron Governorate, Palestine

Yatta يَطَّا
- Municipality type A (City)

Arabic transcription(s)
  - Arabic: يطّا
  - Latin: Yattah (official)
- Location of Yatta within Palestine
- Coordinates: 31°26′52″N 35°05′24″E
- Palestine grid: 163/094
- State: State of Palestine
- Governorate: Hebron

Government
  - Type: City
  - Head of Municipality: Abu Issa

Area
  - Total: 133.0 km^{2} (51.4 sq mi)

Population (2011)
  - Total: 63,511
  - Density: 477.5/km^{2} (1,237/sq mi)
- Name meaning: from Juttah
- Website: www.yatta-munc.org

Yatta (Arabic: يطّا, romanized: Yaṭṭā), also known as Yattah or Yutta, is a Palestinian city located in the Hebron Governorate of the State of Palestine, in the West Bank, approximately 8 km south of the city of Hebron.

Perched atop a hill with a history dating back to ancient times, Yatta is identified with the biblical town of Juttah. In the 4th century it was described as a large Jewish village, a description supported by archaeological discoveries, including a second-century Jewish tomb, reliefs featuring menorahs, and evidence suggesting the presence of a synagogue. The Makhamra clan, which constitutes around half of the town’s population, is known for its traditions of Jewish ancestry. Yatta's cultural heritage also includes traditional costumes and various religious shrines.

During the early Ottoman period, Yatta was a small village. By the advent of the late 19th century, it transformed into a larger village marked by agricultural and pastoral economy, including sheep herding. The succession of governance over Yatta during the 20th century—spanning British, Jordanian, and Israeli control—saw a demographic expansion. Since 1995, the town has been governed by the PNA as part of Area A of the West Bank. According to the Palestinian Central Bureau of Statistics, it had a population of 63,511 in 2017.

== History ==
=== Antiquity ===
Located on a large, ancient hilltop, Yatta has been identified with the site of the Biblical town of Juttah (Hebrew: יוטה). In 1931, a Jewish burial complex dating to the 2nd century CE was found in the town. In the 4th century CE, Eusebius wrote that Yatta was "a very large village of Jews eighteen miles south of Beit Gubrin."

It is possible that the local Makhamra clan, which some of its members claim to have Jewish ancestry, may have origins in an ancient Jewish population. Oral traditions recorded by Jewish orientalist Yizhaq ben Zvi trace their origins to the Jews of Khaybar, who were expelled from the Arabian Peninsula and settled in the area at a later time.

In the late 1980s, researchers Zvi Ilan and David Amit discovered here a lintel adorned with menorah reliefs and a rosette. Excavations in the 1990s uncovered a significant structure dating to Roman-Byzantine times with frescoes and another menorah relief, possibly a synagogue.

Also discovered in Yatta is a Greek inscription, featuring a biblical verse and a Maltese cross on a lintel. Locals said it originated from the nearby ruins of al-Karmil, the ancient Carmel.

Also within the borders of modern Yatta is Khirbet el-Uzeiz (157/093), a ruin identified with the ancient Jewish village of Kefar Aziz (Hebrew: כפר עזיז), hometown of Rabbi Ishmael. Remains of a synagogue has been discovered at the site.

=== Ottoman era ===
Yatta, like the rest of Palestine, was incorporated into the Ottoman Empire in 1517, and in the census of 1596 the village appeared to be in the Nahiya of Khalil of the Liwa of Quds. It had a population of 127 families, all Muslim, and paid taxes on wheat, barley, olives, goats and bee-hives; a total of 9,872 akçe. 5/6 of the revenue went to a Waqf.

In 1838, Edward Robinson and noted Yutta as a Muslim village, located southwest of el-Khulil. He further noted that it had the "appearance of a large modern Mohammedan town, on low eminence, with trees around."

In July 1863 Victor Guérin visited Youttha. He described it as a village of 2,000 inhabitants, but at least half were living in tents, scattered in the all over, partly to finish the harvest, partly to avoid the military recruiters active in the area. An Ottoman village list from about 1870 found that Jatta had a population of 226, in 66 houses, though the population count only included men.

In 1883, the PEF's Survey of Western Palestine described Yatta as being a "large village standing high on a ridge. It is largely built of stone. The water supply is from cisterns. On the south there are rock-cut tombs, and rock wine-presses are found all round the village. The neighborhood is extremely stony; south of the village are scattered olives, which are conspicuous objects; on the west, a little lower under a cliff, is a small olive yard in which the camp of the Survey party was pitched in 1874; to the south-west of camp were a few figs. The inhabitants are very rich in flocks; the village owned, it was said, 17,000 sheep, beside goats, cows, camels, horses, and donkeys. The Sheikh alone had 250 sheep." South of the village are several tombs; one has a shallow semicircular arch cut above a small square entrance. West of the village and of el Muturrif is a very fine rock-cut wine-press. A second occurs north of the village."

=== British Mandate era ===
In the 1922 census of Palestine conducted by the British Mandate authorities, Yatta had a population 3,179 inhabitants, all Muslims, increasing in the 1931 census to 4,034, in 767 inhabited houses, still all Muslims.

In the 1945 statistics the population of Yatta was 5,260, all Muslims, and the land area was 174,172 dunams according to an official land and population survey. 3,254 dunams were plantations and irrigable land, 67,498 used for cereals, while 216 dunams were built-up (urban) land.

=== Jordanian era ===
In the wake of the 1948 Arab-Israeli War, and after the 1949 Armistice Agreements, Yatta came under Jordanian rule.

The Jordanian census of 1961 found 6,326 inhabitants in Yatta.

=== Post-1967 ===
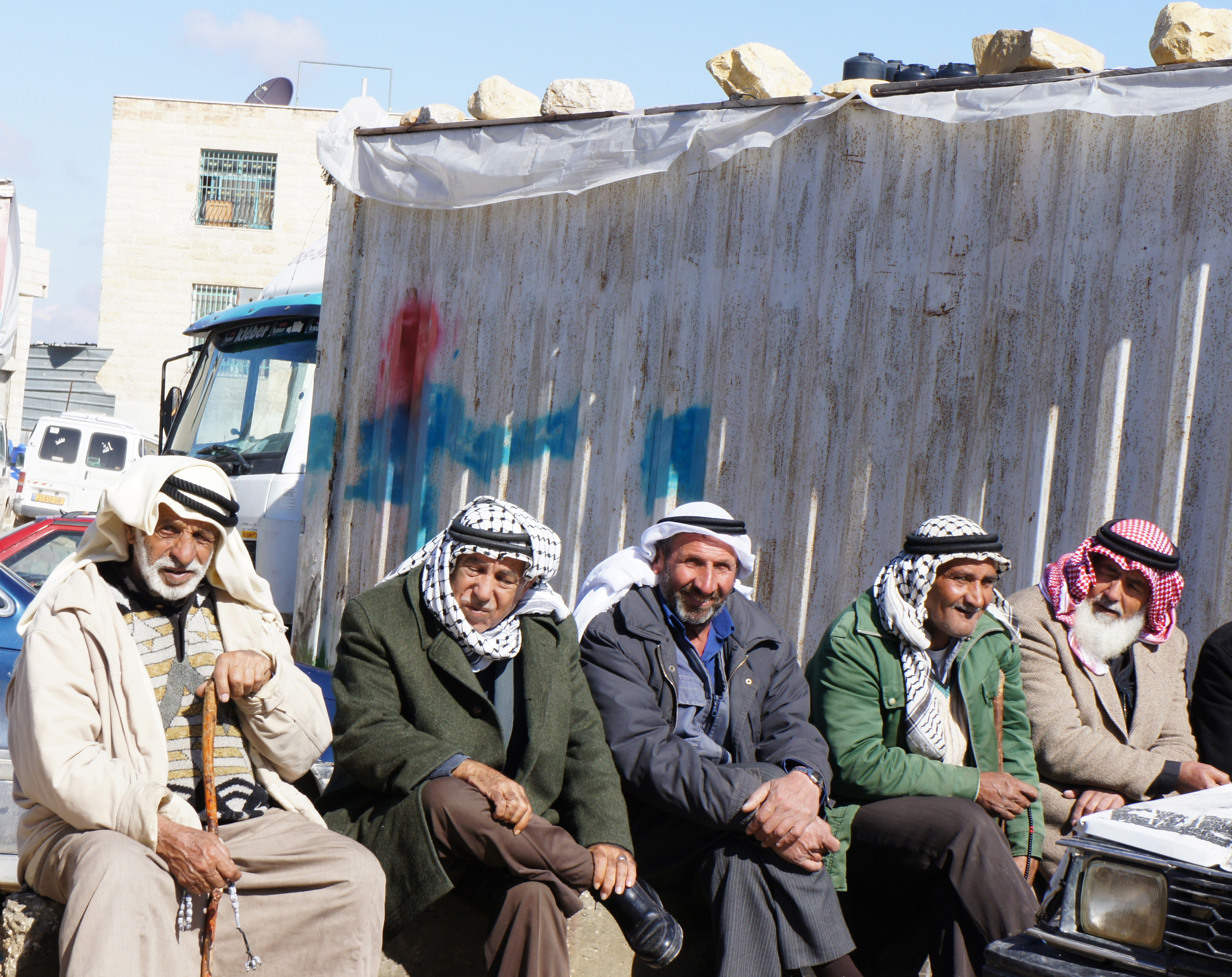
Elderly men in Yatta, 2012

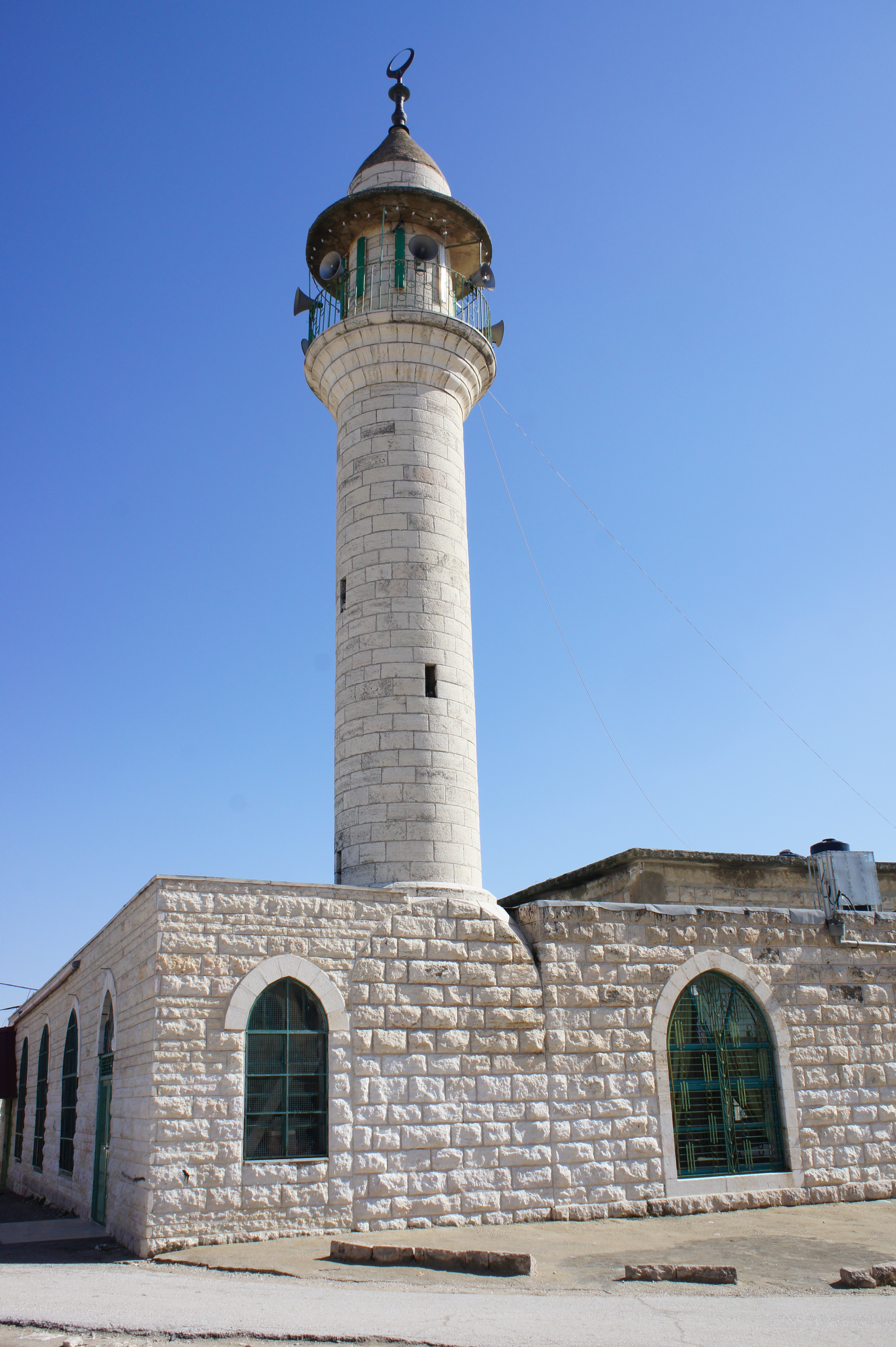
Mosque in Yatta

Since the 1967 Arab–Israeli War, Yatta, like the rest of the West Bank has been occupied by Israel; since 1995, it has been governed by the PNA as part of Area A of the West Bank.

The population in the 1967 census conducted by the Israeli authorities several months after the Six-Day War was 7,281.

On 17 September 2001, a Jewish terrorist group, the Bat Ayin Underground, planted two bombs in the schoolyard at Yatta: One was timed to explode during the recess, and a second bomb several minutes later, in the expectation that teachers and students would be drawn to examine the damage. A malfunction caused the first bomb to explode earlier, and Israeli sappers managed to defuse the second bomb in time.

At least seven Palestinians were killed in Yatta during the Second Intifada in different incidents from 2002 to 2004. On March 8, 2012 Israeli soldiers shot dead 20-year-old Zakariya Abu Eram and injured two others during a raid in the town with the intent of arresting Abu Eram's uncle, Khaled Mahamra. Khaled Mahamra is a Hamas member responsible for the June 2016 Tel Aviv shooting, who was sentenced to life in prison and released as part of the exchange deal to free captive IDF soldier Gilad Shalit. The Israelis stated they fired at the men only after one of them stabbed a soldier during the arrest attempt.

In June 2016, two assailants from Yatta were apprehended after firing upon Israelis dining in a Tel-Aviv café, after which they were charged with killing four people and injuring 16 others.

In June 2019, the mayor of Yatta announced that he decided to change the name of Bahrain Street in his municipality to Marzouq al-Ghanim Street as an act of protest against Bahrain's hosting of a US-led economic workshop.

== Archaeology ==
In the late 1980s, Zvi Ilan and David Amit conducted a survey that unveiled a lintel at the entrance of an old house, adorned with reliefs depicting two seven-branched menorahs flanking a rosette. Nearby, another menorah relief was found on a stone near the remains of a monumental ancient wall. Subsequently, in the 1990s, part of the ancient site at the city's center was converted into a cemetery, prompting a salvage excavation in 1994. This excavation uncovered a significant public structure dating back to the Roman and Byzantine period. Among its remnants were frescoes, a chalk pedestal supporting the base for an attic-style column, and another menorah relief. While the excavation of the building remains incomplete and its architectural plans are still unclear, the discoveries, coupled with Eusebius' description of Yatta as a large village of Jews, suggest the possibility that it may have functioned as a synagogue.

A Jewish burial cave, dating back to the second and third centuries CE, was discovered in Yatta in 1931. It contained six ossuaries of the Late style, used by Jews during the Late Roman period.

Additional discoveries from Yatta include a Greek inscription, featuring the verse "This is the gate to the Lord; the righteous shall enter it" (Psalm 118), which was carved onto a lintel alongside a Maltese cross. Initially published in 1885 and again following a 1980s survey, this inscription likely adorned a Christian structure. Conversations with Yatta residents revealed that, similar to other repurposed artifacts and stones in the village, this specific lintel originated from the ruins of ancient Carmel, today al-Karmil, located near Yatta.

Furthermore, excavations in Yatta revealed capitals indicating a potential date after the 5th century, featuring bosses adorned with rosettes and echinus displaying a Greek cross.

== Culture ==
A Jillayeh dress from Yatta from around 1910 is part of the Museum of International Folk Art (MOIFA) at Museum of New Mexico at Santa Fe.

=== Maqam al-Khidr ===
Maqam al-Khidr, a shrine located 3 km west of Yatta's center, was constructed 150 years ago by a sheikh from Yatta. He claimed to have been instructed in a dream by Elijah, who revealed that he had visited and even slept at this site several times. Elijah directed him to allocate funds for building a monument in his honor at a specified location. The site features a large stone pile measuring 6 by 5 meters. Despite suffering from looting and the theft of antiquities and building materials, it remains a place of prayer for local Yatta residents. They engage in practices such as placing stones, lighting lanterns and candles, and burning incense to honor the saint. Traditionally, on the second Thursday of every April, they gather to sacrifice a sheep and make vows.

== Demography ==
The population of Yatta is primarily made up of several families, including the Makhamra clan, which is divided into the Alaya and Tahta branches, along with Al Da'ajnha, Harizat, and Houshiyeh.

The Makhamra clan believes they descend from the Jewish tribes of Arabia, specifically from the ancient Jewish kingdom of Khaybar in the southwestern Arabian Peninsula. Research by Yitzhak Ben Zvi in 1928 also suggested that three out of the six hamulas (or extended families) in Yatta belonged to the Makhamra clan which possibly descended from a Jewish Arab tribe. In 1938, Arab families from Yatta were reported to observe the Jewish holiday of Hanukkah, lighting candles purchased from the Jewish community in Hebron. Subsequent reports and interviews add more information on the Makhamra's Jewish roots, their distinct identity within Yatta, and the preservation of Jewish customs, such as mezuzah slots in doorways. Two members of the Makhamra family have embraced Judaism and are now citizens of Israel.

Some residents of Meithalun, Fahma and Anzah, villages in the northern West Bank, have their origins in Yatta.

== See also ==
- Masafer Yatta, collection of 19 hamlets within Yatta's municipal boundary
- Shabab Yatta, local football club

== Bibliography ==
- Barron, J.B., ed. (1923). Palestine: Report and General Abstracts of the Census of 1922. Government of Palestine.
- Conder, C.R.; Kitchener, H.H. (1883). The Survey of Western Palestine: Memoirs of the Topography, Orography, Hydrography, and Archaeology. Vol. 3. London: Committee of the Palestine Exploration Fund.
- Dauphin, C. (1998). La Palestine byzantine, Peuplement et Populations. BAR International Series 726 (in French). Vol. III : Catalogue. Oxford: Archeopress. ISBN 0-860549-05-4.
- Government of Jordan, Department of Statistics (1964). First Census of Population and Housing. Volume I: Final Tables; General Characteristics of the Population (PDF).
- Government of Palestine, Department of Statistics (1945). Village Statistics, April, 1945.
- Guérin, V. (1869). Description Géographique Historique et Archéologique de la Palestine (in French). Vol. 1: Judee, pt. 3. Paris: L'Imprimerie Nationale.
- Hadawi, S. (1970). "Village Statistics of 1945: A Classification of Land and Area ownership in Palestine". Palestine Liberation Organization Research Center.
- Hartmann, M. (1883). "Die Ortschaftenliste des Liwa Jerusalem in dem türkischen Staatskalender für Syrien auf das Jahr 1288 der Flucht (1871)". Zeitschrift des Deutschen Palästina-Vereins. 6: 102–149.
- Hütteroth, W.-D.; Abdulfattah, K. (1977). Historical Geography of Palestine, Transjordan and Southern Syria in the Late 16th Century. Erlanger Geographische Arbeiten, Sonderband 5. Erlangen, Germany: Vorstand der Fränkischen Geographischen Gesellschaft. ISBN 3-920405-41-2.
- Mills, E., ed. (1932). Census of Palestine 1931. Population of Villages, Towns and Administrative Areas. Jerusalem: Government of Palestine.
- Palmer, E.H. (1881). The Survey of Western Palestine: Arabic and English Name Lists Collected During the Survey by Lieutenants Conder and Kitchener, R. E. Transliterated and Explained by E.H. Palmer. Committee of the Palestine Exploration Fund.
- Robinson, E.; Smith, E. (1841). Biblical Researches in Palestine, Mount Sinai and Arabia Petraea: A Journal of Travels in the year 1838. Vol. 2. Boston: Crocker & Brewster. (p. 193)
- Robinson, E.; Smith, E. (1841). Biblical Researches in Palestine, Mount Sinai and Arabia Petraea: A Journal of Travels in the year 1838. Vol. 3. Boston: Crocker & Brewster.
- Socin, A. (1879). "Alphabetisches Verzeichniss von Ortschaften des Paschalik Jerusalem". Zeitschrift des Deutschen Palästina-Vereins. 2: 135–163.
- Stillman, Yedida Kalfon (1979). Palestinian costume and jewelry. Albuquerque: University of New Mexico Press. ISBN 0-8263-0490-7.
