= Benny Kalmanson =

Israeli rabbi

Rabbi Benny Kalmanson
- בנימין קלמנזון
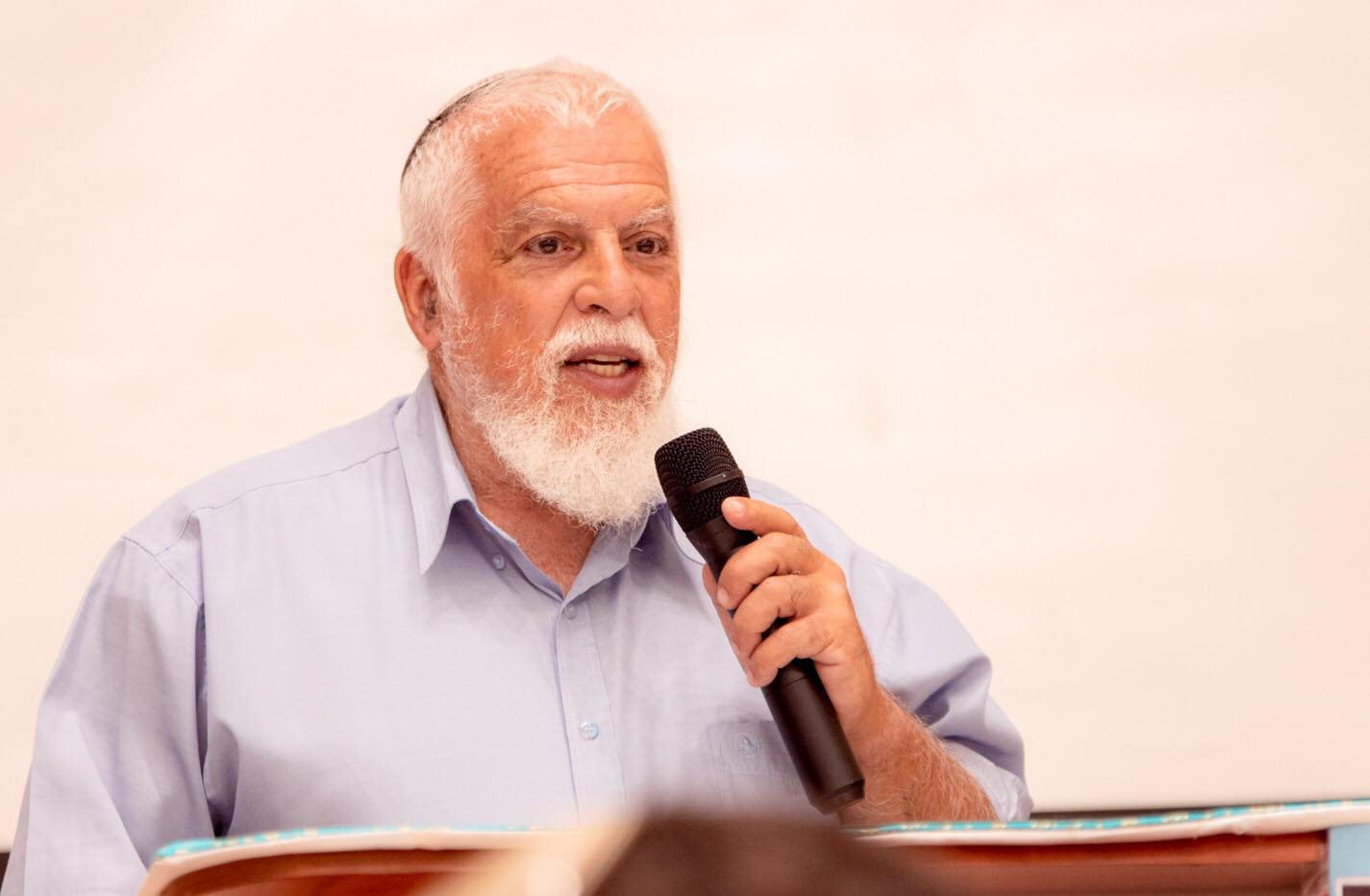
- Kalmanson speaking at Yeshivat Otniel

Personal life
- Born: May 23, 1957 (age 69)
- Children: 6
- Occupation: Rabbi

Religious life
- Religion: Judaism
- Denomination: Orthodox

Binyamin "Benny" Kalmanson (Hebrew: בנימין קלמנזון), or Kalmanzon, is a religious Zionist Israelis rabbi who founded Yeshivat Otniel and headed the yeshiva until 2022.

== Early life ==
Kalmanson grew up in the Nave Sha'anan neighborhood of Haifa. He attended a regular high school, then later a high school yeshiva in Netanya and also the Noam Midrash in Pardes Hanna. During his studies at the Yeshivat HaKotel, he became a student of rabbi Shagar and was greatly influenced by him. He became a rabbi after studying at the Bnei David Institute in Psagot, and was ordained by rabbi Ovadia Yosef.

During his military service in the Israel Defense Forces, Kalmanson served as a soldier and officer in the 77th Battalion of the 7th Armored Brigade.

== Career ==
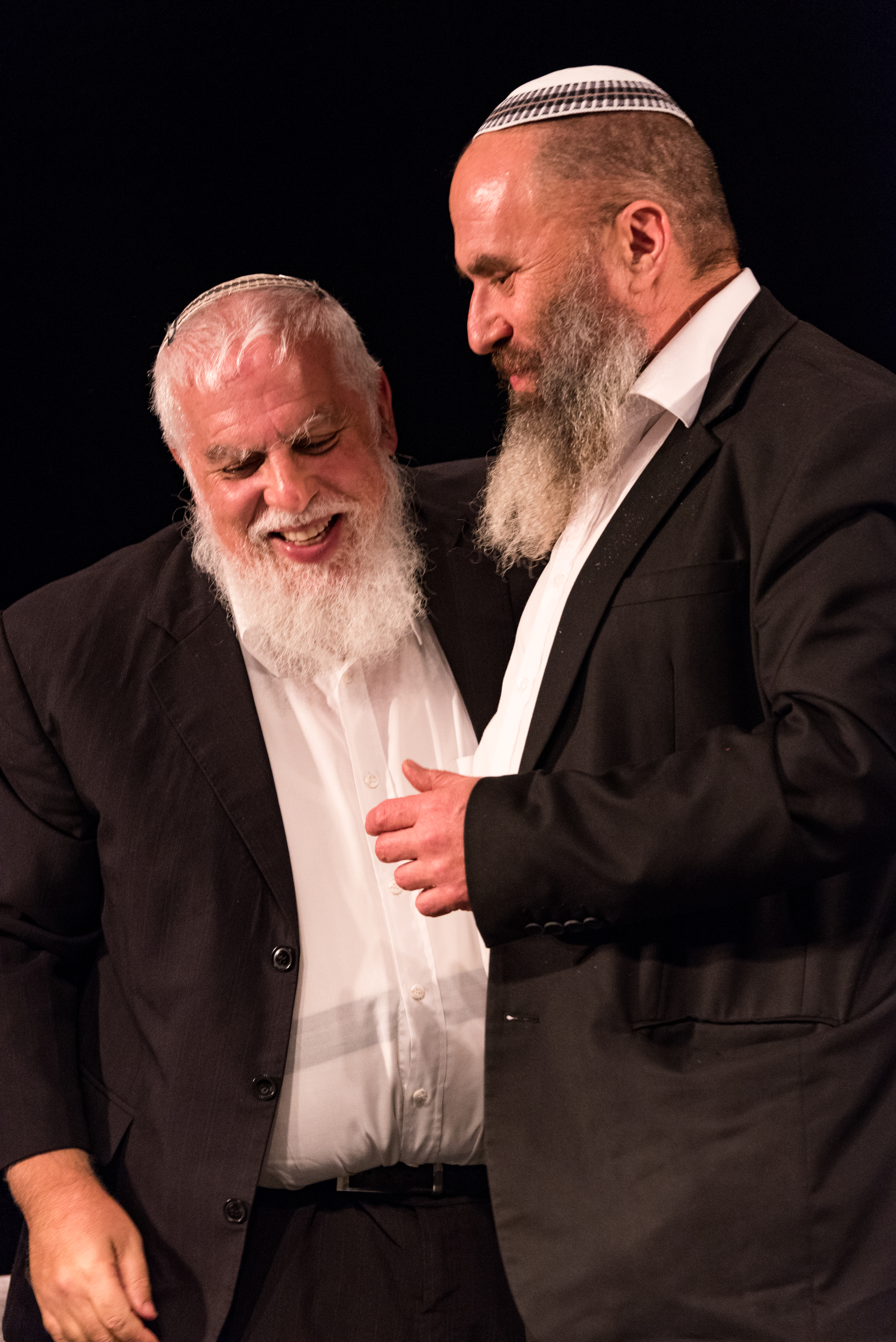
Rabbi Kalmanson (left) with rabbi Re'em Ha'Cohen (right).

Kalmanson served as the head of the hesder yeshiva at Kiryat Shmona. In 1987, he founded a kollel with rabbi Ami Olami in Otniel, called the Yeshivat Otniel. In 1993, Kalmanson invited rabbi Re'em Ha'Cohen to serve alongside as head of the yeshiva. In October 2021, Kalmanson announced his retirement from leading the yeshiva, and left in 2022.

Kalmanson was a doctoral candidate in Israeli history and thought, but did not complete his doctoral thesis. He also serves as a member of the pedagogical council of the School for Holocaust Studies. As part of Holocaust remembrance, Kalmanson works as a tour guide for youth and adults visiting Poland. During the Holocaust, Kalmanson's own father was in Warsaw, and Kalmanson's entire family was murdered.

Amidst worsening Israeli settler violence in the West Bank, Kalmanson joined other settler leaders in rejecting the acts of violence done against Palestinians.

In January 2026, Kalmanson spoke at an event protesting against a Knesset bill that would allow for Haredi draft exemption, arguing that it would endanger the state.

In July 2026, Kalmanson and other rabbis expressed disappointment towards the Religious Zionist Party and are exploring the possibility of creating a new right-wing party.

== Personal life ==
Kalmanson is married to Yochi, a psychologist, they have six children and live in Otniel.

During the October 7 attacks, two of Kalmanson's sons and one grandson arrived at Be'eri to help rescue residents. This threesome was afterwards popularly referred to as the Elhanan Team. During fighting in the Be'eri massacre, Kalmanson's eldest son Elhanan was killed.

Kalmanson's nephew, Pdaya Mark, was killed while fighting in the Gaza war, while another nephew, Shlomi Mark, was killed in a car accident while heading to work.

On 21 April 2026 during Yom HaZikaron, Kalmanson played the harmonica at the grave of his son in commemoration.
