= Dror Weinberg =

Israeli military officer (1964–2002)

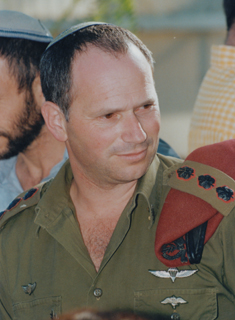
- Native name: דרור וינברג
- Born: October 26, 1964
- Died: November 15, 2002 (aged 38)

Dror Yitzhak Weinberg (Hebrew: דרור וינברג; October 26, 1964 – November 15, 2002) was a Colonel in the Israel Defense Forces (IDF). Killed during the 2002 Hebron ambush, Weinberg was the highest-ranking officer killed in the Second Intifada.

== Biography ==
Weinberg was born in Kfar Saba to Uriel and Bat-Sheva. When he was two and a half years old, his two uncles, his mother's brothers, were killed in the Six-Day War. He studied in a state-religious school in his hometown. He was a member and a guide in the Bnei Akiva youth movement in Kfar Saba. In high school, he studied at the Noam religious high school in Pardes Hanna and then at the Yashlatz in Jerusalem.

=== Military Service ===
Weinberg enlisted in the IDF in 1983 and volunteered for Sayeret Matkal. He underwent a training course as a fighter in the unit, completed an infantry officers' course with distinction, and served as a team commander in the unit. In Sayeret, he participated in various covert operations and was decorated for one of these operations. He also took part in an operation to free hostages in the Bus 300 affair. Weinberg served in the unit as a valued team commander. In 1987, he moved to the Paratroopers Brigade and served as the deputy commander of the August 1987 company in Battalion 890. In 1988, he completed a company commanders' course and took command of the support company in Battalion 890. As a commander, he led the company in operations in Lebanon, on one hand, and fought against improper norms introduced by veteran soldiers in the company, on the other. During his command, the company was crowned as the outstanding company. Afterwards, he served as a battalion operations officer, went to study at the Command and Staff College, and returned to serve as an operations officer in the brigade. He went on to study for a bachelor's degree in Political Science and Middle Eastern studies at the Hebrew University of Jerusalem.

After completing his studies, Weinberg was appointed as the commander of Battalion 890 of the Paratroopers Brigade, a position he had aspired to since moving to the paratroopers, and led it during the fighting in southern Lebanon. During his command of the battalion, it achieved operational successes and was awarded the title of outstanding battalion in the brigade. He then served as the commander of the Maglan unit. In this position, he made significant changes in the unit's special capabilities and led it to operational successes in Lebanon. In 1999, Weinberg was promoted to the rank of Lieutenant Colonel and commanded Brigade 623 (a reserve Paratroopers Brigade) and concurrently the Intelligence and Reconnaissance School (MoS) in Tze'elim. In his last position, he served as the commander of the Judea Brigade ("Hebron Brigade") in the Judea and Samaria Division. As the brigade commander, he managed to establish good relations both with the Jewish settlers and with the Palestinians. Weinberg insisted on a determined fight against terrorists in a focused and pinpoint manner, without unnecessary harm to "uninvolved" civilians and those innocent of any crime. The approach was successful, and Hebron was considered relatively calm. Shortly before his death, Weinberg was informed that he had been decided to be appointed as the commander of the regular Paratroopers Brigade.

Three weeks before the attack, as part of the "Judea First" plan, the IDF withdrew its forces from the city of Hebron. The withdrawal was against Weinberg's opinion, who estimated that the withdrawal would damage the IDF's ability to efficiently thwart attacks. In the days before the attack, information was received about the organization of a cell to carry out an attack, but IDF forces refrained from entering the area of the city of Hebron due to the "Judea First" plan.

On the night of Saturday, 11th of Kislev 5763 (November 15, 2002), a terrorist cell carried out an attack on the "Worshippers' Route" in Hebron. Weinberg, who was at the brigade headquarters at the time, rushed to the event. When he got out of the jeep to locate the terrorists, he was hit by a bullet and died of his wounds shortly after. In the incident, 12 people were killed, including soldiers and members of the Kiryat Arba emergency response team.

Weinberg was buried in the military cemetery in Kfar Saba, next to his two uncles who were killed in the Six-Day War. Thousands of civilians and soldiers attended his funeral. He was eulogized by the Chief Rabbi of Israel, the Minister of Defense, the Chief of Staff, his friends, and his family. He left behind a wife and five children. A few months after his death, his widow gave birth to another son named Dror Nehemiah. In 2005, she remarried, to Avi Roeh. During Operation Protective Edge, one of his sons was moderately injured. Another son was severely injured.

== Commemoration ==
In January 2003, the "Bnei Dror" fighters' company was established in Battalion 97 "Netzach Yehuda", named after Dror.

Named after him are the "Netivot Dror" Yeshiva in Or Akiva, the "Netivot Dror" study hall in Telem, and the "Dror Project" in the Bnei Akiva youth movement.

The "Beit Doresh" synagogue in Kfar Saba is named after him and his brother Shai, who died of an illness about a year and a half after Dror's death.

In 2013, "Beit Dror", a regional emergency center in Mount Hebron, was opened in a former Adorayim base building.

In 2014, his friend Rabbi Meir Cohen established an agricultural high school yeshiva named "Pioneers of Dror" in Bnei Netzarim.

Every year, an 11-kilometer race called "Dror Race" or "Torch Race" is held, from the settlement of Carmel to the settlement of Susya.

A spring east of the settlement of Beit El is named after him "Ein Dror". Its Arabic name is "Ein-Dahrah".
