= 2002 Hebron ambush =

Palestinian Islamic Jihad attack during the Second Intifada

- Part of the Second Intifada
| Date | 15 November 2002 |
| Location | Hebron, West Bank, Palestinian territories |
| Result | Palestinian Islamic Jihad victory |

Belligerents
| Israel | (Palestinian Islamic Jihad) Islamic Jihad Movement in Palestine |

Commanders and leaders
| (Israel) Col. Dror Weinberg †; Samih Sweidan † | (Palestinian Islamic Jihad) Muhannad Sadr |

Units involved
| (Israel) IDF Nahal Brigade; Israeli Border Police (Israel) Kiryat Arba Emergency Response Team | Jerusalem Brigades, the armed wing of Palestinian Islamic Jihad |

Strength
| (Israel) Unknown; Unknown | (Palestinian Islamic Jihad) 3 fighters |

Casualties and losses
| (Israel) 12 killed (Israel) 14 wounded | (Palestinian Islamic Jihad) 3 killed |

The 2002 Hebron ambush took place in the Wadi an-Nasara neighborhood in Hebron in the West Bank on 15 November 2002. Israeli forces were subjected to a double attack by fighters from the Palestinian Islamic Jihad. The battle was referred to in Israel as "The attack on the worshippers' route" (Hebrew: הפיגוע בציר המתפללים) The place where the attack took place became known as the "Alley of Death" in both Hebrew and Arabic. The ambush was initially dubbed the "Sabbath massacre" (Hebrew: טבח השבת) by official Israeli spokespersons.

The attacks were carried out by three Palestinian fighters in a narrow alley, off of the passage from the Tomb of the Patriarchs to the south gate of Kiryat Arba. Twelve Israeli soldiers and security guards, including three high-ranking officers, were killed in the battle, as were all three of the Palestinian fighters.

== The ambush ==
One of the fighters positioned himself near the front of the entry gate of Kiryat Arba from Hebron. The remaining two fighters positioned themselves near a narrow alley, off the road used as a passage by Jewish worshipers heading to Kiryat Arba from the Tomb of the Patriarchs.

Four Nahal Brigade soldiers on patrol, accompanied by Border Police jeeps were heading out of the "Worshippers Way" after patrol that area. In addition, two additional Nahal soldiers were positioned in an observation post located nearby and several more IDF soldiers were located near the exit gate of Kiryat Arba.

Settlers from Kiryat Arba visiting the Cave of the Patriarchs in Hebron for a Sabbath eve service were escorted home by Israeli soldiers. A few minutes after the all clear signal indicating that all the settlers had returned safely, the first bullets were fired.

At 6:55 pm the Palestinians opened fire simultaneously on a group of soldiers guarding the south gate of Kiryat Arba and a patrol passing through a narrow alley leading from the Tomb of the Patriarchs to Kiryat Arba. Two soldiers in the alley were wounded. A soldier was killed while trying to evacuate the wounded.

The Palestinian fighters moved positions frequently during the more than 4 hours of fighting creating the impression that many more fighters were involved. They lured Israeli forces off the "Path of Worshipers" into the narrow alley, later known as the "Alley of Death".

Minutes later Border Police Superintendent Samih Sweidan arrived at the scene and drove immediately into the alley to engage the Palestinian fighters and evacuate the wounded. He and his driver were shot to death at point-blank range as they stepped out of their jeep. Meanwhile, one of the injured soldiers trapped in the alley died of his wounds. Within five minutes, four Israeli soldiers were dead. A few minutes later a fifth soldier was shot and killed. The dead and wounded remained in the alley.

Around 7:15 pm the Palestinian fighters ceased fire, creating the impression that they had run away. At this time the commander of the IDF Hebron Brigade, Colonel Dror Weinberg arrived at the scene. He quickly organized a force of three jeeps and entered the alley. When Weinberg reached Sweidan's jeep he was hit by a bullet to the chest and was severely wounded. After being evacuated he died from his wounds, becoming the highest ranking Israeli casualty of the Second Intifada.

Before being hit Col. Weinberg had contacted the settler's security service, the Kiryat Arba Emergency Response Team. Around 7:40 pm the head of the response team, Yitzhak Buanish, entered the alley together with a force consisting of his own men and Border Police soldiers. As in the previous rescue attempts, they were ambushed. Buanish and two of his colleagues were killed and another five wounded. Two Border Police officers were also killed in the incident. The first Palestinian fighter was probably killed in this incident as well.

At 7:50 pm the IDF entered the alley with armored personnel carriers and started engaging the Palestinians. Firing continued until 8:15 pm when the Palestinians stopped firing back and the dead and wounded soldiers could be evacuated. But fighting flared up again.

Control over the situation was gradually restored with the arrival of reinforcements and commanding officers. Lieutenant Colonel Eran, head of the Nahal Brigade in Hebron, and soldiers from the Duvdevan elite unit, rushed to Hebron from Ramallah, outflanked the two remaining gunmen and killed them. That was close to 11:30 pm, more than four hours after the attack started.

== The Islamic Jihad fighters ==
The attack was carried out by three members of the Jerusalem Brigades, the military wing of the Islamic Jihad Movement in Palestine. According to a statement by the Jerusalem Brigades the attack was carried out as revenge for the death of the regional Islamic Jihad leader Iyad Sawalha in Jenin earlier in the week as well as "other crimes against our people". According to Israel, Sawalha was responsible for two suicide bombings that killed 31 Israelis.

The three fighters were all in their early 20s and enrolled as engineering students at the Palestine Polytechnic University. According to Palestinian sources they had prepared the ambush for more than two months, scouting the area of the attack thoroughly and studying Israeli security arrangements along the road between the Cave of the Patriarchs and Kiryat Arba. The operation was planned as a suicide attack and the participants had written wills.

== Fatalities ==
Twelve Israeli soldiers and three Saraya al-Quds (Islamic Jihad) fighters died in the ambush. An additional 14 Israeli soldiers were wounded in the clash.

IDF soldiers

- Col. Dror Weinberg (commander of the Hebron brigade)
- Lt. Dan Cohen (Hebron brigade)
- Sgt. Igor Drobitsky (Hebron brigade)
- Cpl. David Marcus (Nahal brigade)

Israeli Border Policemen

- Ch.-Supt. Samih Sweidan (Hebron Border Police Chief of Operations)
- Sgt. Tomer Nov
- Sgt. Gad Rahamim
- St.-Sgt. Netanel Makhlouf
- St.-Sgt. Yeshayahu Davidov

Kiryat Arba Emergency Response Team

- Yitzhak Buanish (head of the Kiryat Arba Team)
- Alexander Zwitman
- Alexander Dohan

Saraya al-Quds (Islamic Jihad) fighters

- Akram 'Abd al-Muhsen al-Hinuni
- Walaa' Hashim Da’ud Surour
- Dhiyab Muhammad 'Abd al-Mu’ti al-Muhtasib

== The hunt for "Muhannad" ==
Muhannad Sidr was a gifted student at the Hebron University, where he became active in the Islamic Jihad student organization. After graduation he went underground and adopted the cover name "Muhannad". After the killing of a settler in Givat Harsina, Shin Bet realized that Sidr was an important figure in the Jerusalem Brigades, the military wing of the Palestinian Islamic Jihad. In fact, Sidr was the military head in Hebron. Sidr was steadily building a network of cells of four-five members each.

Dror Weinberg early noticed Sidr and made a lot of efforts to catch or kill him. Somehow Sidr always managed to slip away. In December 2001, Sidr was the target of an assassination operation. An Israeli Helicopter fired a missile at the car Sidr was riding in, but it missed its target and hit another car with a civilian family inside, killing two children. "Sidar [sic] is always one step ahead of us", Weinberg complained.

Instead of Weinberg ambushing Sidr, it would be Sidr ambushing his nemesis. It was one of Sidr's cells that carried out the ambush in which Weinberg was killed.

A month later another of Sidr's cells would kill two soldiers outside the Abraham mosque. Two weeks later, a third cell would attack the military yeshiva near Hebron.

Eventually, the Shin Bet caught up with "Muhannad". In 2003, he was cornered in a building in Hebron and killed in the shoot-out.

A month later Majid Abu Dosh was killed in similar circumstances outside Hebron. According to Haaretz, Abu Dosh was the "operations officer" of Islamic Jihad in the Hebron area and the right-hand man of Sidr. Abu-Dosh is said to have planned the attack on Worshipers' Way in Hebron.

== Israeli response ==
The Palestinian-administered part of Hebron was re-occupied by Israeli forces and a curfew was declared throughout the city. The curfew remained in force for more than six months. Four Palestinian houses were demolished by the IDF.

Prime Minister Ariel Sharon told IDF commanders in Hebron two days after the incident that a territorial continuity between the settlement of Kiryat Arba and the Jewish section of Hebron must be created and the safety of the Jews living in the divided city be ensured, reducing to a minimum the presence of Palestinians in the area in which the settlers live.

The mayor of Kiryat Arba, Zvi Katsover, called on the government to "clean up the area" by destroying Palestinian buildings along a road connecting Kiryat Arba to Hebron. The Kiryat Arba Council and the council of settlers in Hebron's Jewish enclave requested building of 1,000 housing units between Kiryat Arba and the Tomb of the Patriarchs. Housing and Construction Minister Natan Sharansky supported the plan and ordered his ministry's workers to review the possibility of expropriating lands in the city and using them for Jewish residential purposes.

On 29 November 2002 the Israel Defense Forces issued the "Decree Number 61/02/T to Expropriate Property" with the purpose to expropriate an 8.2 dunam large area in Hebron and to create a 6 to 12 meter wide corridor linking the Jewish settlement in Hebron with Kiryat Arba. According to the American administration and Israeli sources close to the planning, the aim of the expropriation of the land and the building of the promenade was to create territorial contiguity between Kiryat Arba and Hebron. The military order was appealed to the High Court of Justice. The petition was rejected by the High Court after the IDF declared that they intended to demolish only two houses. In August 2004, three of the 22 buildings originally considered for demolition were destroyed. On 30 December a Palestinian teenager Imran Abu Hamadiya (17 years old) was apprehended by a Border Police patrol from his home near the Cave of the Patriarchs, where the policemen produced a knife and claimed it was his, as a pretext for placing him in the patrol car. He was found dead near the Hebron Industrial zone 20 minutes later. After an investigation four border policemen were arrested. The young man had been beaten and then thrown out of the patrol car at full speed, causing his head to fatally strike the road.

== Reactions ==
Official Israeli spokesmen initially described the battle as a massacre of civilian Israeli settlers returning from Sabbath prayers. Gilad Millo, spokesman of the Israeli Ministry of Foreign Affairs, originally called the attack as the "Sabbath massacre," and Israel's Foreign Minister Benjamin Netanyahu released a statement, calling the event "The cold-blooded attack on civilians whose only 'sin' was to go to a holy place of worship on the eve of the Jewish Sabbath and on those people assigned to protect them". International media outlets initially reported that the Palestinian ambush had targeted both settlers and soldiers. The following day army officials said that only soldiers or security personnel were hurt in the ambush. Matan Vilnai – a former general and a leading Labour Party politician – said that "[i]t wasn't a massacre, it was a battle." On 15 November, the Spokesman for the UN Secretary-General Kofi Annan condemned "the despicable terrorist attack... that today killed 10 Jewish worshippers on their way to the Sabbath eve prayers... [a] terrorist act against Israeli civilians". but on 19 November, the Spokesman for Secretary-General said, "The information available to us when the statement was issued was that the victims were Israeli civilians returning from religious service...Subsequently, it now appears that the Israeli victims were in fact soldiers and security personnel" and urged "a broad approach to resolving the Middle East conflict".

== Aftermath ==
The IDF's conduct during the Hebron ambush was heavily criticized. Many settlers blamed the death of the three Kiryat Arba security men on the "cowardice" of IDF soldiers. Three Israeli officers were dismissed from their posts in December 2002 for their personal failures in the Hebron ambush. The death of several high-ranking officers created a "command vacuum" that the remaining officers proved unable to fill, creating "a situation in which the decision-making fell into the hands of civilians (local settlers)" – the Response Team members. An IDF source told Haaretz that "When civilians command the army - this is not an acceptable situation as far as we are concerned."

The "Giborim outpost" (מאחז הגיבורים) was constructed on the site in which the battle took place, originally including a small number of temporary structures and tents. These residences housed a number of young people and families who then demanded to build a neighborhood on the site in memory of the fallen. 30 days after the incident the outpost was evacuated by the Israel military forces. Since then the area has been declared a 'closed military area' by the local IDF commander.

The three Response Team members, who all worked full-time in the security service, were accorded military ceremony funerals "due to their involvement in Hevron security". A month after the incident, the three killed civilian security men were formally recognized by the Ministry of Defense as "fallen soldiers." The Israeli Chief of Staff posthumously granted the Chief of Staff Medal of Appreciation to Yitzhak Buanish, Alexander Zwitman and Alexander Dohan - the Kiryat Arba Emergency Response Team, as well as to Elijah Liebman, the chief of security of the Jewish community in Hebron. After his death, Sgt. Gad Rahamim was granted the Medal of Courage for his part in the battle.

On 12 December, two Palestinian fighters from Islamic Jihad walked up to two Israeli Military Policemen, from the Sahlav unit, doing guard duty outside the Cave of the Patriarchs and shot them point-blank. The two soldiers were identified as Cpl. Keren Ya'akobi, and Sgt. Maor Kalfon. The former was the first female operational fatality of the IDF in the Second Intifada.

On 27 December four yeshiva students, two of them IDF soldiers, were killed in the Yeshivat Otniel shooting attack in the settlement of Otniel, south of Hebron. The attack was carried out by the same unit of the Islamic Jihad that carried out the Hebron ambush.

== See also ==
- 2024 Tarqumiyah shooting
- Ein_'Arik_checkpoint_attack
- 2002 Wadi al-Haramiya sniper attack
