= Asa'el =

Israeli settlement in the West Bank

Asa'el: עשהאל (Hebrew)
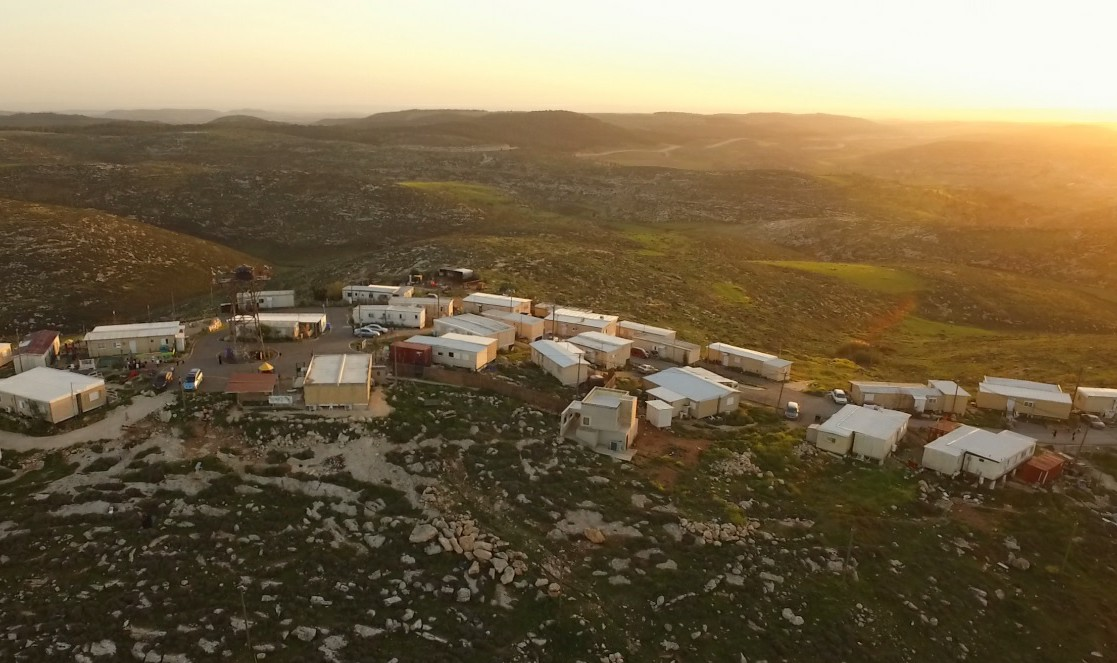

- Location within the Southern West Bank
- Coordinates: 31°22′25″N 35°02′37″E
- Country: Palestine
- District: Judea and Samaria Area
- Council: Har Hevron
- Region: West Bank
- Founded: 2002, legalized 2023
- Website: http://asael.org.il

Asa'el (Hebrew: עשהאל), also known as Mitzpe Asa'el (Hebrew: מצפה עשהאל, lit. 'Asa'el Lookout'), is an Israeli settlement in the West Bank. Located three kilometres south-east of Shim'a, it falls under the jurisdiction of Har Hevron Regional Council. The international community considers Israeli settlements in the West Bank, like Asa'el, illegal under international law, but the Israeli government disputes this.

Although built on what the Israeli government claims to be state lands, access roads to the settlement goes over private land owned by Palestinians.

== History ==
The settlement was established in early 2002 as an outpost, and was named after Biblical Asahel from the time of King David (2 Samuel 2:18).

In 2008 it was announced that the Yesha Council was making preparations to evacuate the outpost, but the evacuation did not take place. The outpost continued to grow, with 60 new constructions registered between 2010 and 2020, and 12 new constructions in 2021.

The outpost was officially recognized by the Israeli government in September 2023.
