= Negohot =

Israeli settlement in the West Bank

Negohot: נגוהות (Hebrew)
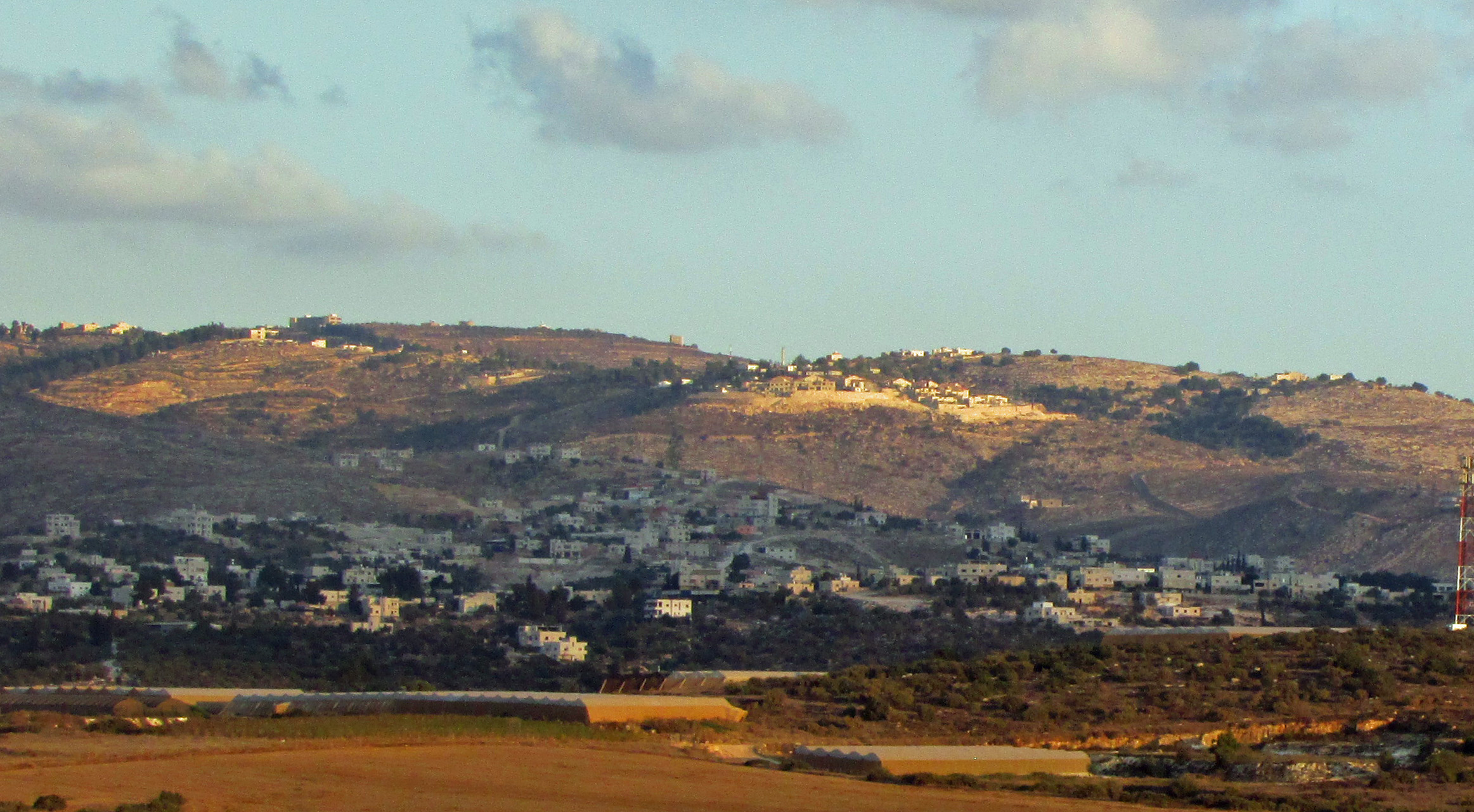
- Negohot is seen on the hill

- Location within the Southern West Bank
- Coordinates: 31°29′34″N 34°59′0″E
- Country: Palestine
- District: Judea and Samaria Area
- Council: Har Hevron
- Region: West Bank
- Affiliation: Amana
- Founded: 1982
- Founder: Nahal
- Population (2024): 592

Negohot (Hebrew: נגוהות) is an Israeli settlement in the southern Hebron Hills of the West Bank. Located on a hill 700 m (2,300 ft) above sea level to the west of the Hebron area, it is organised as a community settlement and falls under the jurisdiction of Har Hevron Regional Council. In 2024 it had a population of 592.

The nearest Israeli locality is Shekef, a moshav a few kilometres over the Green Line in the Hevel Lakhish area of the Shephelah. The international community considers Israeli settlements in the West Bank illegal under international law, but the Israeli government disputes this.

== History ==
The village was first established in 1982 as a pioneer Nahal military outpost. The name comes from the Hebrew word nogah, meaning “ray of light." In 1998, constraints of the Nahal brigade led to the village changing hands and being turned over hesder soldiers who volunteered for extra service to keep a residential presence on that hilltop. The soldiers renovated the area, built a beit midrash and eventually completed their army service and continued to raise families there.

On 25 September 2003, the night of Rosh Hashana, a member of Islamic Jihad knocked on the door of a family in Negohot and opened fire, murdering two Israelis, including Shaked, a 7-month-old baby girl, while they were eating their holiday meal.

Many of the residents work outside the village, though some have opened small businesses there, among them the Negohot hive which produces local honey. The children of Negohot study at 'Dvir' elementary school in Otniel. Negohot receives assistance from the Amana settlement organization.
