= Mitzpe Eshtemoa =

- Location within the Southern West Bank Location within the West Bank
- Coordinates: 31°23′35″N 35°00′56″E
- Country: Palestine
- District: Judea and Samaria Area
- Council: Har Hevron
- Region: West Bank
- Founded: 2003

Mitzpe Eshtemoa (Hebrew: מצפה אשתמוע, lit. 'Eshtemoa Lookout') is an Israeli outpost in the West Bank. Located to the north of Shim'a, it falls under the jurisdiction of Har Hevron Regional Council. It was established in early 2003 and named after the nearby biblical site of Eshtemoa (Joshua 15:50; 21:14).

The international community considers Israeli settlements in the West Bank illegal under international law, but the Israeli government disputes this.
