= Adora, Har Hevron =

Israeli settlement in the West Bank

Adora: אֲדוֹרָה (Hebrew)
- Israeli settlement

Hebrew transcription(s)
  - Unofficial: Adorah
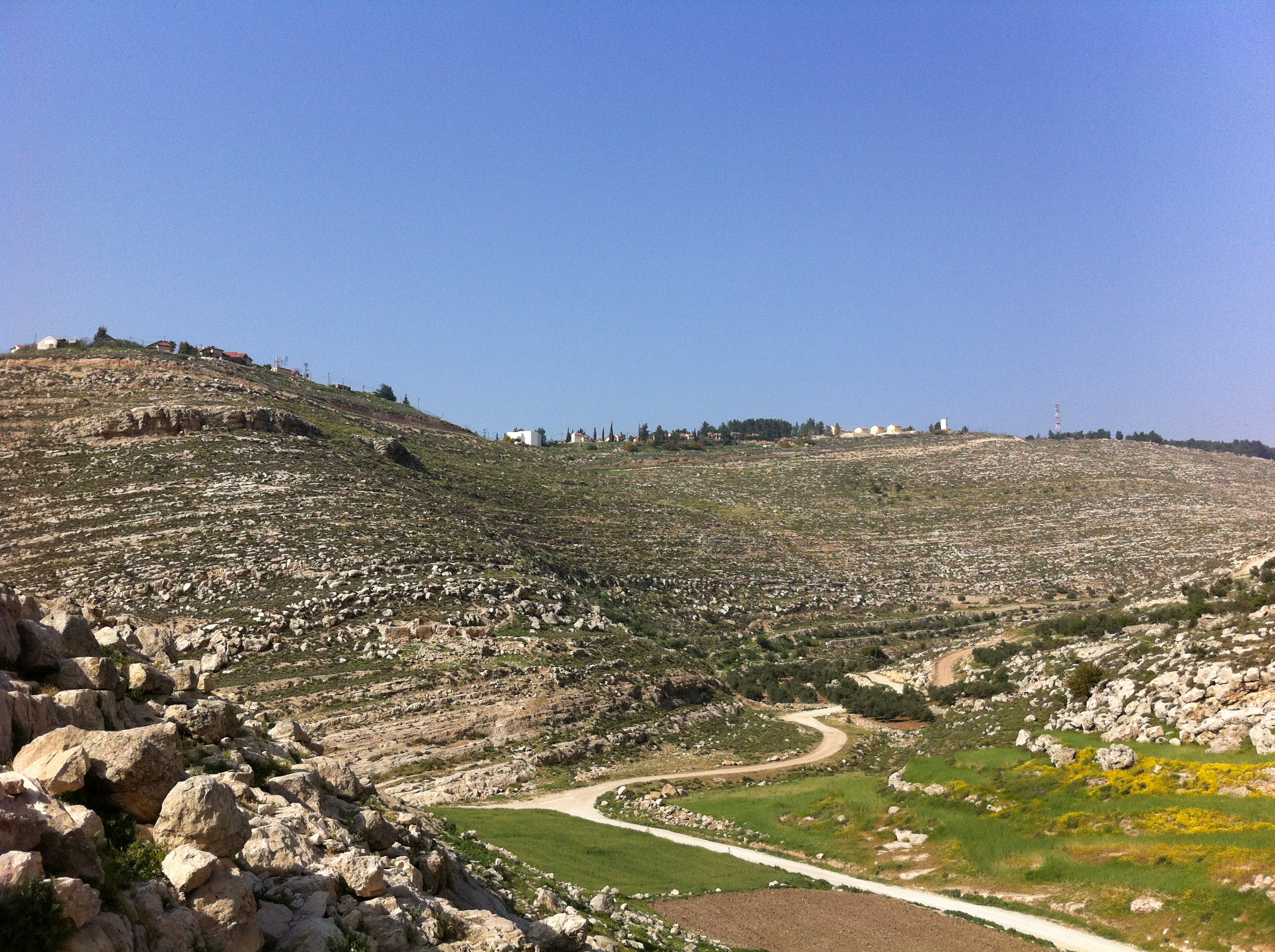

- Location within the Southern West Bank
- Coordinates: 31°33′08″N 35°01′08″E
- Country: Palestine
- District: Judea and Samaria Area
- Council: Har Hevron
- Region: Judaean Mountains
- Affiliation: Mishkei Herut Beitar
- Founded: 1982/1984
- Population (2024): 575

Adora (Hebrew: אֲדוֹרָה) is an Israeli settlement organised as a community settlement in the Judean Mountains in the southern West Bank, northwest of Hebron. Established in 1984, the community ideologically identifies with the Herut–Betar farming organization and falls under the jurisdiction of Har Hevron Regional Council. Under the terms of the Oslo Accords of 1993 between Israel and the Palestine Liberation Organization, Adora was designated Area "C" under full Israeli civil and security control. In 2024 its population was 575.

The international community considers Israeli settlements in the West Bank illegal under international law, but the Israeli government disputes this.

== Etymology ==
Adora is named after the biblical town Adoraim mentioned in 2 Chronicles 11:9, one of the fortified cities of the ancient Kingdom of Judah under the rule of Rehoboam. The name of the Palestinian town of Dura, located four kilometers south of Adura, is also derived from the ancient Adurim.

== History ==
Adora was established in 1982 as a Nahal para-military outpost and demilitarized two years later when handed over to civilians. In 1983, a core group of families from Kiryat Arba, Beit Shemesh, Kiryat Gat, and Or Akiva, joined one another in preparing to settle the barren hilltop. After a week of preparations at the Faculty of Agriculture in Rehovot, about half the families of the original 23 were told to be ready to move into trailers to be installed at the site with the government's permission. In January 1984, the group was warned that another core group might occupy the trailers before them. On 11 and 12 January 1984, the group moved in and began a wave of settlement expansion in the region.

Adora is situated east of the Israeli West Bank barrier, 6.4 kilometers from the Green line in the Judean hills northwest of Hebron at an altitude of 692 metres (2270 feet). The settlement has a total area of about 360 square meters. According to a 2006 Peace Now-report, 36.01 percent of the land Adora is built on, is privately owned, all or most of it by Palestinians. According to Israeli law, settlements on privately owned Palestinian land are illegal. According to ARIJ, Israel confiscated about 1000 dunams of land from the nearby Palestinian town of Tarqumiyah in order to construct Adora.

== Israeli-Palestinian Conflict ==
In the 27 April 2002 Adora terrorist attack, three Palestinian gunmen dressed like Israeli soldiers infiltrated the settlement of Adora on a Sabbath morning and attacked and killed four residents, including a 5-year-old girl, and injured seven. One of the assailants was later killed by the IDF.
