= Orit Mark Ettinger =

Hebrew media professional (born 1999)

- אורית מרק אטינגר
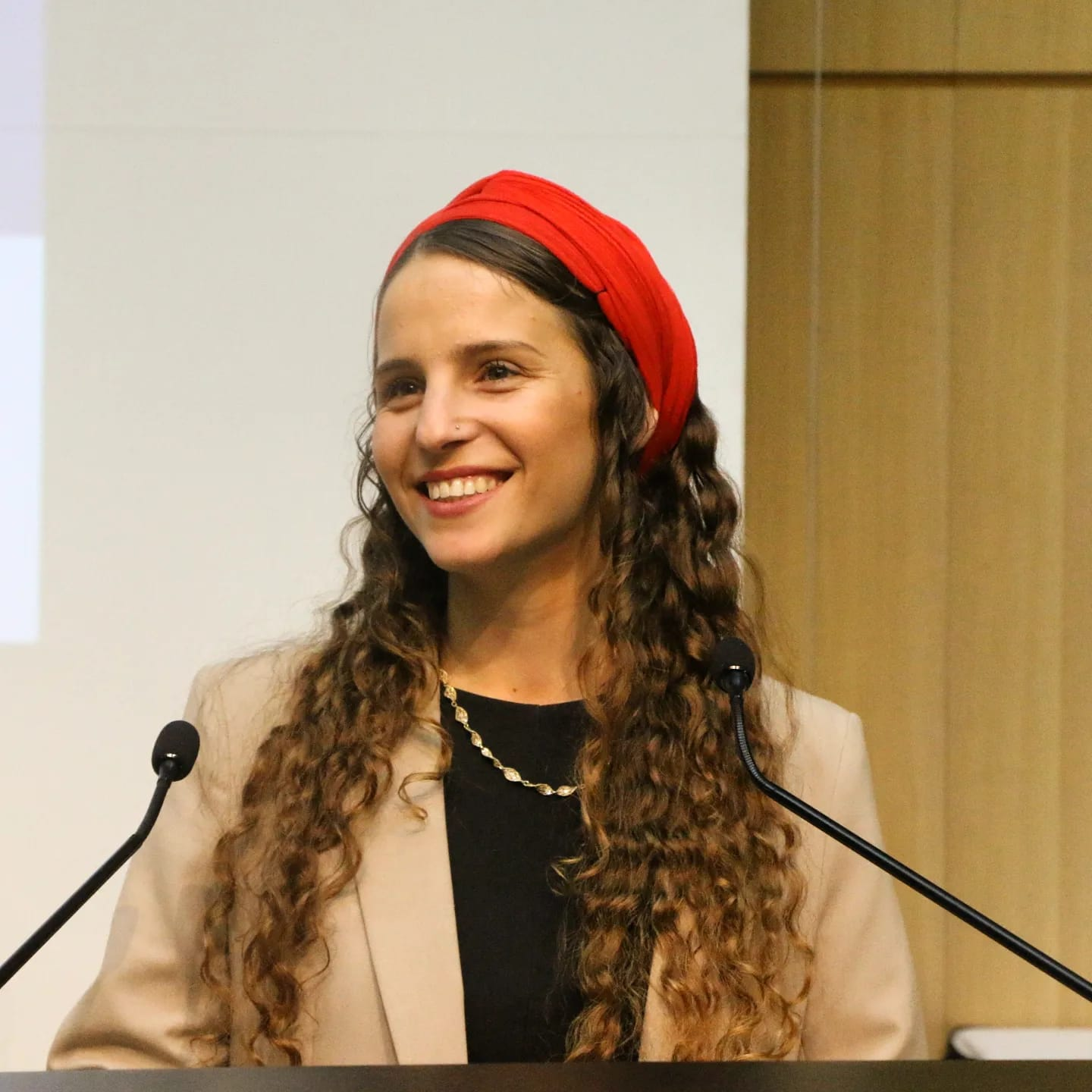
- Born: September 9, 1999 (age 26)
- Children: 1
- Father: Michael (Miki) Mark
- Website: https://oritmarkettinger.com/en/english/

Orit Mark Ettinger (Hebrew: אורית מרק אטינגר; born September 9, 1999), is a media professional, author, social entrepreneur, lecturer, advocacy activist, and the founder and CEO of the Or Michael Foundation.

As part of her advocacy efforts in Israel and abroad, Ettinger shares her personal story about the 2016 attack in which she lost her father Michael, her mother was critically injured, and her two siblings, Pdaya and Tehila, were moderately and lightly injured. In 2019, her brother Shlomi was killed during his service in a classified security position, and during the War of Iron Swords, Orit lost her cousin Elhanan Klamenzon, whose team (Elhanan Team) was awarded the Israel Prize for Civilian Heroism posthumously. On October 31, 2023, Orit lost her younger brother Pdaya, who was killed in the Nimr incident in Gaza.

Orit is the sixth of ten siblings in the Mark family.

== Biography ==
Orit was born in the settlement of Otniel, the sixth of ten child of Michael (Miki) Mark, the director of the Hebron Hills Development Corporation and head of the Yeshivat Otniel, and her mother Havi, an accountant.

In high school, she studied at the Even Shmuel Ulpana and then completed her national service with the "One Family" organization, which supports victims of terror and hostile actions. During her national service, she managed the organization's public relations.

In 2019, she took a course in public diplomacy and Israeli advocacy at the International Center for Public Diplomacy and Israeli Advocacy in Tel Aviv. In 2022, she completed a bachelor's degree in communication and politics at Hadassah College.

=== "Or Michael" Foundation ===
Orit is the founder and CEO of the "Or Michael" Foundation, a commemorative organization in memory of her murdered father, which encourages youth to engage in social action for Israeli society.

The foundation engages thousands of young people from across the country and is active in twenty-five hospitals. As part of its activities, the foundation has received certificates of appreciation from hospital directors nationwide.

=== Works ===
In 2020, she released her debut single "Far from the World," produced by Yonatan Avidani and with artistic advice from Stav Beger.

In 2023, she published her first book, "Broken Ray of Light," through Yedioth Books.

In 2024, during the Gaza war, she released the children's book "Child of Light" with her husband through Yedioth Books, a book that bridges the story of the war for children.

== Awards and Recognition ==
- Certificate of appreciation for community involvement and contribution (2026).
- Heroes of Israel Award from the World Zionist Organization (2026).
- Knesset Speaker's Award (2026).

== Personal life ==
Orit is married to Daniel and is a mother to a child. They live in Giv'at Shmuel.
