= Worshippers Way =

Road in the West Bank

Coordinates: 31.5248°N 35.1151°E

Worshippers Way or Prayers Road in Hebron, West Bank is a road linking the Israeli settlement of Kiryat Arba with the Cave of the Patriarchs and with the Jewish settlements in Hebron. The road is used by Israelis and tourists who visit the Cave and the Old City of Hebron. Palestinians are denied vehicular use of the road. The road was expanded after an ambush near Kiryat Arba that took place in November 2002. The expansion required that adjacent Palestinian land be expropriated, which resulted in a legal battle. A number of buildings of architectural and historical value, dating back to the Mamluk-Ottoman period, were also expropriated and destroyed.

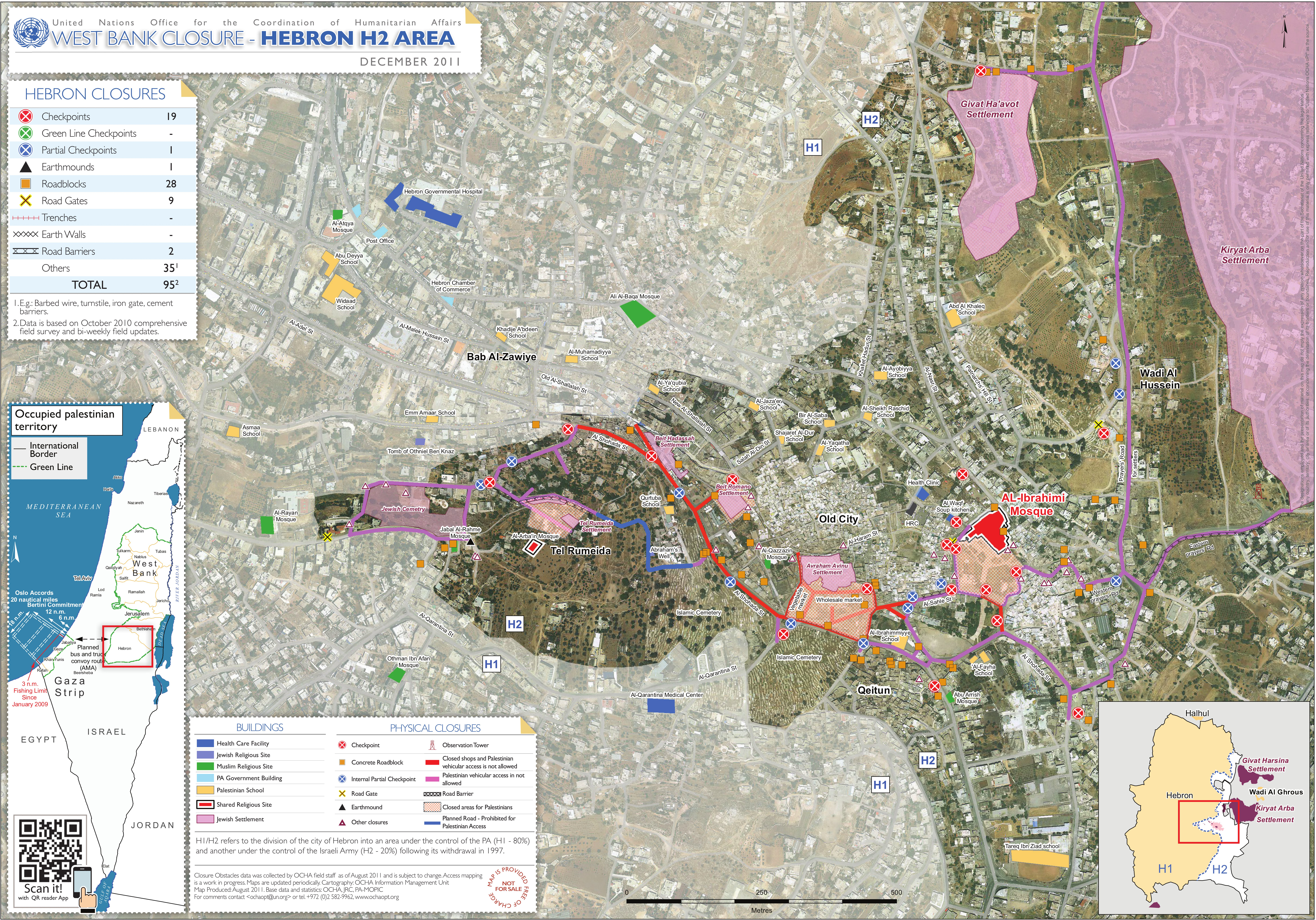
Map of the H2 area in Hebron

== Names ==
The Worshippers route has been given numerous names, such as "Worshipper's Way", "Worshipers' Way", "Worshippers' Path", etcetera. Before the Israeli High Court the route was called "prayers' path" and "Worshippers' Way".

An alley running parallel to the western part of the route is used by settlers on foot, who call it "Simtat Erez."

== Background ==
Kiryat Arba is an Israeli settlement on the outskirts of Hebron, just outside the eastern municipality border. It is located close to the Cave of the Patriarchs and six Jewish settlements south of the Old City of Hebron. Kiryat Arba has more than 7,500 residents, while as of 2005, the settlements in Hebron housed some 600 settlers, secured by about 1,500 soldiers. Kiryat Arba was built at the edge of the area which the 1967 Allon Plan envisioned as being annexed to Israel, while Hebron itself would be part of an enclave with Palestinian self-rule.

Originally, the settlers used a route running from the northern entrance via Al-Shuhada Street (which was closed to Palestinians) to the Cave of the Patriarchs. This road, connecting all the Jewish locations in Hebron, is known by Israelis as "Tzir Zion Road", or "Route of Zion", and was closed to Palestinian traffic in 2001, after two Israeli settlers were killed. In August 2009, the route was reopened to 80 local Palestinian families.

Following an ambush near Kiryat Arba in 2002, in which 12 Israeli soldiers and security guards were killed, Israel wanted to build a road directly connecting the southern gate of Kiryat Arba with the Cave.

== Plans after the 2002 Hebron ambush ==
One day after the 2002 Hebron ambush, Zvi Katzover, the Mayor of Kiryat Arba, called on the government to "clean up the area" between Kiryat Arba and the Tomb of the Patriarchs and to destroy the hundreds of Palestinian homes along this short stretch of road. The next day, Prime Minister Ariel Sharon said that "the opportunity that now presents itself in the wake of the attack ... must be exploited to establish new facts on the ground" and that ″a window of opportunity existed in the coming 48 hours to establish a "compact" zone of Jewish territorial contiguity between Kiryat Arba and the Jewish enclave in the heart of Hebron, including the Tomb of the Patriarchs″. Earlier in 1996, Sharon had presented a plan for a Jewish zone from Kiryat Arba to Tel Rumeida and Beit Hadassah, including the ancient Karaite and Sephardi cemeteries. Housing and Construction Minister Natan Sharansky supported the plan to link the settlements and build settlement contiguity.

Tourism Minister Yitzhak Levy ordered his ministry to speed up its preparations for a "tourism promenade" between Kiryat Arba and the Tomb of the Patriarchs. The plan envisioned a Jewish settlers–only promenade consisting of an open promenade in an area that was not – at the time – built up, and an "alley promenade" through the southern edge of the old town of Hebron, among ancient buildings with cultural, historical, archaeological and architectural values.

The Kiryat Arba Council and the council of settlers in Hebron's Jewish enclave announced a plan to build 1,000 housing units between Kiryat Arba and the Tomb of the Patriarchs, in the area in which the ambush had taken place. Housing and Construction Minister Natan Sharansky supported the plan and ordered his ministry's workers to review the possibility of expropriating lands in the city and using them for Jewish residential purposes.

== Expansion ==
Two weeks after the ambush, on 29 November 2002, the Israel Defense Forces (IDF) issued a sequestration order to seize Palestinian lands and demolish a number of buildings under "Decree Number 61/02/T to Expropriate Property". Contradictory to the original promenade plan, 22 buildings of architectural and historical value, dating back to the Mamluk-Ottoman period would be demolished in the old town of Hebron "for military needs". A 730 meters long and 6 to 12 meters wide corridor was planned on 8.2 dunams of expropriated land, about a quarter of which in the old town of Hebron. According to the High Court, the total width of the alley was originally planned to amount 8 meters. Thirteen buildings along the south–western part of the route were to be demolished, and a concrete wall was to be built along the north–eastern part of the route.

According to the American administration and Israeli sources close to the planning, the aim of the expropriation of the land and the building of the promenade was to create territorial contiguity between Kiryat Arba and Hebron.

On 1 December 2002, the IDF posted warrants to seize and demolish 15 Palestinian properties, with the plan to widen the road. On 8 December 2002, the IDF started the expansion of the road with a large truck and bulldozers, while a work stoppage order, issued by the High Court, ordered them not to demolish Palestinian buildings adjacent to areas planned for the new promenade.

On 11 December 2002, the Municipality of Hebron and Palestinian landowners issued a petition (HCJ 10497/02) at the High Court against the sequestration. Another petition (HCJ 10356/02) was issued by Israeli conscientious objectors of Yesh Gvul. Following the petitions and remarks of the court, the plan was adapted; the width of the promenade would be smaller, and only 3 of the 13 houses demolished. The houses were already abandoned for years after the army had declared the area a closed military zone.

In February 2003, the High Court prohibited the demolition of the 22 houses from to the Mamluk-Ottoman period. According to UNESCO, eventually three of them were destroyed and eleven others damaged.

In its decision of 4 March 2004, the High Court stipulated that praying in the Tomb was part of the constitutional right to freedom of religion and worship for the residents of the area. It even stated that ″The freedom of religion is a constitutional basic right of the individual, of a status even higher than other constitutional human rights″. The Court decided that the right to freedom of religion and worship for the settlers of Kiryat Arba, including a safe route to the Tomb, prevailed over the right to private property for the Palestinian landowners. It found that the ″relative impingement upon property rights of the property owners along the route, which was limited to a minimum″ justified the expropriation of the Palestinian lands.

After the High Court decision, on 7 May 2004, the IDF ordered the demolition of 11 houses in the Wadi Al-Nassara and Haret Jaber neighborhoods, and the confiscation of 700 square meters of Palestinian land close to the Ibrahimi Mosque belonging to the Waqf, all located in the area between Kiryat Arba and the Mosque. On 10 August, the Israeli Army demolished the houses, dating back to the Ottoman and Mamluk periods.

== Third route, Dana Way ==
In 2004, settlers built a cement path in the Wadi al Hussein (Wadi a-Nasara) from the southwestern entrance of Kiryat Arba to the Worshippers Way, called "Dana Way". Initially, the State ordered the IDF to remove the path, but the IDF ignored the orders. When the Palestinian land owners went to the Israeli High Court (HCJ) in 2007, the State first declared that the path would be demolished, but later said it was needed for military reasons. The IDF declared that it was a military security road, with a secondary use by worshippers as a pedestrian path. In May 2010, the land owners received a land seizure order, which in effect legalized the already existing dirt road.

On 1 February 2012, the High Court ruled on a petition against the 2010 land seizure order and approved the path, based on security reasons, as a more secure alternative to Worshippers Way.

== Criticism ==
Human rights organization HaMoked criticized the role of the High Court as supporting the Israeli state in institutionalizing the presence of the settlers in the territory, which is illegal under international law. While international law forbids to destroy or seize the enemy's property if not necessary for imperative operational military needs, the state argued that the expanded road was needed for the safety of the settlers; the state itself, however, was party to the illegal presence of the settlers. HaMoked blamed the Court for accepting, without a "second guess", the state's and the army's assertion that the road was not meant to create Jewish territorial contiguity, but was based purely on security considerations and was meant to protect the lives of the worshippers using the road.

== See also ==
- Al-Shuhada Street
- Israeli–Palestinian conflict in Hebron
