= Elhanan Team =

Israeli ad hoc civilian defense on October 7

Elhanan Team, also spelled Elchanan Team or Kalmanson Team (Hebrew: צוות קלמנזון), was the name of an Israeli ad-hoc defensive group during the October 7 attacks in 2023, consisting of brothers Elhanan (also spelled Elchanan) and Menachem Kalmanson and their nephew Itiel Zohar. The three traveled from their home to confront Hamas militants during the massacre in Kibbutz Be'eri near the Gaza Strip, during which Elhanan was killed on the morning of October 8. For their actions, in 2024 the team was awarded the Israel Prize for Civilian Heroism, Israel's highest civilian honor.

== Background ==
On the morning of 7 October 2023, during the holiday of Simchat Torah, the Hamas and Palestinian Islamic Jihad militant organizations launched a surprise attack on Israel. Under the cover of a barrage of thousands of rockets, over 6,000 militants, including 3,800 from the "elite Nukhba forces" and 2,200 civilians and other militants infiltrated from the Gaza Strip into dozens of Israeli communities and military facilities in the area of the Gaza Strip and its surroundings, engaging in firefights with limited security forces. The militants carried out massacres and rapes, murdering 1,150 people, including 779 civilians, and abducting about 253 people, including women, elderly and infants, to the Gaza Strip. In the early hours, they were confronted by reserve forces, Israel Police officers, Border Police fighters, and IDF soldiers who were outnumbered. In the battles, about 1,550 militants were killed on Israeli soil, and on the Israeli side, 55 police officers, 10 members of the General Security Service, and 301 soldiers were killed. One of the largest massacres in the surprise attack was the Be'eri Massacre, in which about a hundred civilians and security personnel were killed.

== Events ==
After the outbreak of the October 7 attacks, brothers Elhanan and Menachem Kalmanson and their nephew Itiel Zohar traveled from their home in Otniel to Kibbutz Be'eri near the Gaza Strip. They evacuated civilians from Kibbutz Be'eri from 6:00 p.m., and their nephew Itiel joined them a little later. The team operated for about 16 hours under fire, using an IDF armored vehicle they had found abandoned on a roadside. At 9:00 a.m. on Sunday, they encountered a militant dressed in black who was hiding in the corner of one of the houses and opened fire on Elchanan with a burst of bullets. Elchanan shouted 'I've been hit' and fell near the entrance of the house. His teammates shot at the militant and rescued Elchanan, but the militant was not killed. Elchanan lost consciousness. After the arrival of an IDF force that provided cover, Elchanan was evacuated to a field hospital, where they waited for his evacuation by helicopter to a hospital, but they were forced to declare him dead on the spot.

The Elhanan team rescued about 100 members of the kibbutz under fire and for many hours.

According to Education Minister Yoav Kisch, the team is credited with saving the lives of dozens of residents of the kibbutz.

== Legacy ==
On March 19, 2024, Kisch awarded the Elhanan Team a special Israel Prize, Israel's highest civilian honor, in the Civilian Heroism category, for their actions on October 7. The justification for the award stated: "Menachem Kalmanson, his late brother Elchanan, and their nephew Itiel Zohar left their home in Itamar on Simchat Torah to save the lives of residents of the communities in the Gaza Strip area. Despite being told they were not needed, they arrived at Kibbutz Be'eri and entered the besieged kibbutz time and time again for many hours, thus saving dozens of kibbutz residents. In the last house they entered, a militant lay in ambush and shot and killed Elchanan Kalmanzohn, brother of Menachem."

In her lectures and interviews around the world, Orit Mark Ettinger, Kalmanson's cousin, tells the story of their heroism.
