= Adoraim =

Biblical town in Mount Hebron

Coordinates: 31.50506°N 35.0275°E

Adoraim (Hebrew: אֲדוֹרַיִם ʾĂḏōrayīm), Adora (Ancient Greek: Αδωρά, romanized: Adōrá) or Adurim was an ancient town in the Hebron Hills, southwest of Hebron. It is documented in several ancient sources, including the Bible, the Apocrypha, the Zenon Papyri, and the writings of Josephus. During the Iron Age, Adoraim was a part of the Kingdom of Judah. During the Second Temple period, it was inhabited by Edomites.

Presently, Adoraim corresponds to the Palestinian city of Dura, which has preserved the ancient name. The nearby Israeli community settlement of Adora is named after the ancient city.

== Etymology ==
In the Hebrew Bible, the city is referred to as Adoraim (2 Chron. 11.9). The city was called by Macabees Adora (1 Macc. 13.20). The same name was also often used by Josephus. A weak letter is usually lost in Hebrew to Arabic sound conversion, such as in the case of Adoraim to Dura. A loss of a first feeble letter is not uncommon and the form of Dora could be found as early as in several instances of Josephus writings.

== Historical sources and archaeology ==
=== Iron Age ===
==== Biblical reference ====
According to 2 Chron. 11.9, Adoraim was fortified by Rehoboam (974 BC – 913 BC), King of the United Monarchy of Israel and later the first king of the Kingdom of Judah, who was a son of Solomon and a grandson of David.

According to Guy Le Strange, the city locality is in the Vale of Mamre mentioned in the story of The Twelve Spies who brought back to Moses large grapes of Eshkol as recorded in the Book of Numbers.

=== Babylonian period ===
In the early 6th century BCE the Babylonians attacked the Kingdom of Judah, and the southern part of the country, from Adoraim near Hebron to Maresha and beyond, fell to Edom.

=== Hellenistic period ===
Following Alexander the Great's conquest, the entire region came under Ptolemaic and later Seleucid rule. Adoraim is mentioned in the Zenon Papyri in 259 BCE as a "fortress city". In Adora, Simon Maccabeus stopped the advancing army of Diodotus Tryphon in 142 BCE.

A fragmentary anti-Jewish libel preserved by the Greek writer Menasseas of Patara (probably 3rd–2nd century BCE) and later repeated by the Egyptian writer Apion (as quoted and refuted by Josephus in Against Apion), names Adora ("Dora") as the home city of Zebidos, an Edomite who allegedly disguised himself as Apollo, the god worshipped by the people of Dora (possibly a Hellenized stand-in for Qos), entered the Jerusalem Temple, stole a golden donkey-head idol, and carried it back to his own city. Historian Bezalel Bar-Kochva dates the story to the mid-3rd century BCE.

According to Josephus, Hasmonean ruler John Hyrcanus captured the city after the death of Antiochus VII, circa 129 BCE. The city inhabitants, who were alleged to have been of Esau's progeny (Idumeans), were forced to convert to Judaism during the reign of Hyrcanus, on the condition that they be allowed to remain in the country. Hyrcanus "hired foreign troops, dismantled Adora and Marissa, the strong places of Edom, and forced the Edomites to accept the Jewish religion and submit to circumcision. This is the first instance of forcible conversion in Jewish history."

=== Roman period ===
In 63 BC, Pompey's conquest of Judea reshaped the regional dynamics. Adora emerged as a significant center within Idumaea, overshadowing the waning importance of Hebron. It found a place in the roster of cities rebuilt under the auspices of the Roman consul Aulus Gabinius. During this era, Adoraim, like several other Jewish urban centers, displayed some level of Hellenization. It's proposed that it might have served as the administrative center for the Eastern Idumaea district established by Gabinius, although other suggestions exist. Subsequently, possibly during the time of Herod, the district's capital was relocated to Engeddi.

During the 1st century CE, an opulent mansion, continuously inhabited until the outbreak of the First Jewish–Roman War (66–74 CE), was built at Hirbet Moraq near Dura. This remarkable residence, serving as the focal point of an estate, boasted amenities such as a bathhouse and a layout featuring interior chambers surrounding an open courtyard, all adorned with colonnades. Inscriptions indicate that the house was owned by a Jewish family. This unique "introverted" architectural design had evolved in the region during the Hellenistic period.

== Folklore ==
According to a local tradition, it is believed that the patriarch Noah, the tenth of the pre-flood Patriarchs, as the story of Noah's Ark is told in the Hebrew Bible, was laid to rest in Dura. To honor him, a shrine has been erected in the city. The local Maslama tribe is said to have Jewish ancestry.

== See also ==
- Dura, Hebron
- Adora, Har Hevron

== Bibliography ==
- Avi-Yonah, M. (1977). The Holy Land: a historical geography from the Persian to the Arab conquest (536 B.C. to A.D. 640). Grand Rapids: Baker Book House.
- Berrett, L.M.C. (1996). Discovering the World of the Bible. Grandin Book Company. p. 196. ISBN 9780910523523.
- Mukaddasi (1895). Description of Syria, including Palestine. Translator: Guy le Strange. Palestine Pilgrims' Text Society.
- Robinson, E.; Smith, E. (1841). Biblical Researches in Palestine, Mount Sinai and Arabia Petraea: A Journal of Travels in the year 1838. Vol. 3. Boston: Crocker & Brewster.
