= Eliyahu Libman =

Israeli politician

Eliyahu Shalom Libman
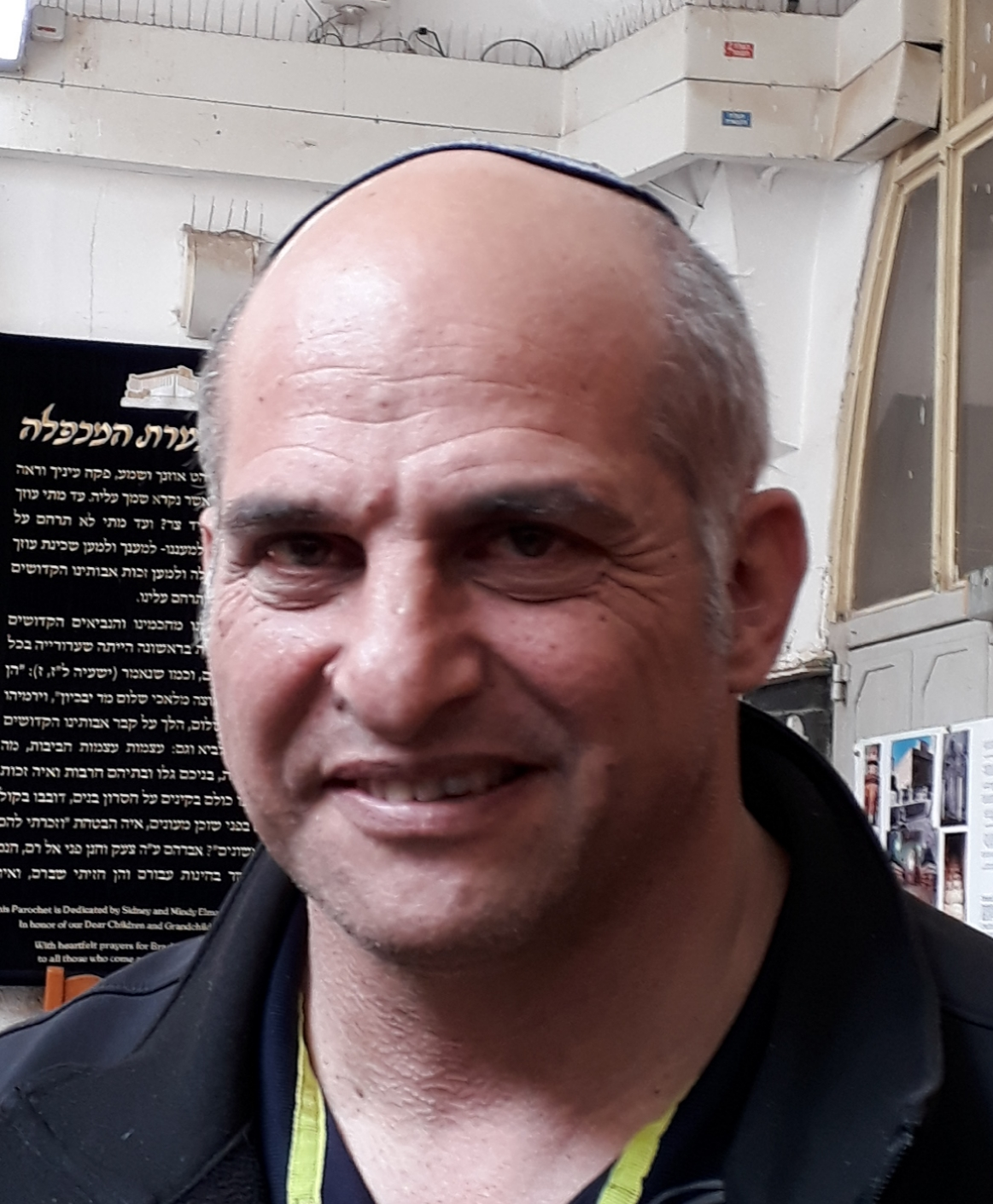
- Eliyahu Libman, March 2019

Head of the Kiryat Arba Local Council
- In office 20 November 2018 – 19 March 2024
- Preceded by: Malachi Levinger
- Succeeded by: Israel Bramson

Personal details
- Born: 1970 (age 55–56)
- Spouse: Avishag Libman
- Awards: Chief of Staff's Commendation

Eliyahu Shalom Libman (אליהו שלום ליבמן; born 1970) is an Israeli public servant who served as head of the Kiryat Arba local council. He previously served as the security officer of the Jewish community in Hebron, and is a recipient of the Chief of Staff's Commendation.

== Early life ==
Libman was born to Rabbi Menachem and Rachel Libman, among the founders of the modern Jewish settlement in Hebron.

He grew up in Kiryat Arba and in the Beit Hadassah neighborhood. At the age of ten, he witnessed the Beit Hadassah massacre, in which six Jewish worshippers were murdered and sixteen others were wounded.

At 15, he volunteered with Magen David Adom, and in 1988 he enlisted in the Israel Defense Forces through a Hesder program.

He served in the Golani Reconnaissance Unit, completed the IDF Infantry Officers' Course and returned to his unit, eventually rising to the rank of lieutenant colonel.

== Security career ==
From 1992 to 2018, Libman served as the security officer of the Jewish community in Hebron.

On 7 November 1993, following a shooting attack in which Ephraim Iyobi, the driver of Rabbi Haim Druckman, was wounded, Libman was first on the scene and administered first aid, though Iyobi later died.

On 21 March 2001, Libman witnessed the Murder of Shalhevet Pass. In 2002, he participated in the Battle of Worshippers' Way ("Tzir HaMitpalelim") in Hebron, assisting IDF forces in locating the terrorists and rescuing the wounded. For his actions, he received the Chief of Staff's Commendation from Moshe Ya'alon.

In 2003, he rescued Nitzan Pelleg, then an IDF engineering officer, from an ambush in Hebron by positioning his vehicle to block the line of fire until extraction.

== Political career ==
In the 2018 Israeli municipal elections, Libman won 53% of the votes in Kiryat Arba, defeating the incumbent Malachi Levinger who received 39%.

In 2021, he called for the assassination of Taysir Abu Sneineh, the Mayor of Hebron, who had participated in the Beit Hadassah massacre which Libman had witnessed as a child.

In June 2023, he voiced public support for the Hilltop Youth, stating: “The heroes of this generation are the Hilltop Youth, who risk their lives in the struggle for the holy land.”

In September 2023 he announced he would not run for another term in the 2023 Israeli municipal elections.

Due to the outbreak of the Iron Swords War, elections were postponed to February 2024. In January 2024, during the war, he called for the renewal of Jewish settlement in the Gaza Strip.

Ahead of the 2026 elections for the 26th Knesset, Libman joined Noam's list.

== Personal life ==
Libman is married to Avishag (née Segal), and they have eight children. They reside in the Givat HaAvot neighborhood of Kiryat Arba. His brother, Yehuda Libman, runs a religious high school in Rehelim, and serves as a reserve battalion commander.

Another brother, Israel Libman, founded, and directs, the non-profit Mekimi. His wife, Shira Libman, serves as CEO of the Yesha Council. His brother-in-law is cantor and conductor Yotam Segal.

In 1998, Libman's brother Shneor Shlomo Libman and Harel Ben-Non were murdered in the Yitzhar shooting attack (1998).

=== Elyakim Libman ===
His son Elyakim Libman, who served as a security guard during the Nova music festival massacre, was initially believed to be among the Israeli hostages held by Hamas.

During the campaign for his return, Libman publicly criticized the Hostages and Missing Families Forum and opposed any release of Palestinian prisoners.

He established the Tikva Forum. On 3 May 2024 it was revealed that Elyakim had been killed on 7 October and that his remains were mistakenly buried in Holon Cemetery alongside another victim.
