= Telem (Israeli settlement) =

Israeli settlement in the West Bank

Telem: תֶּלֶם (Hebrew)
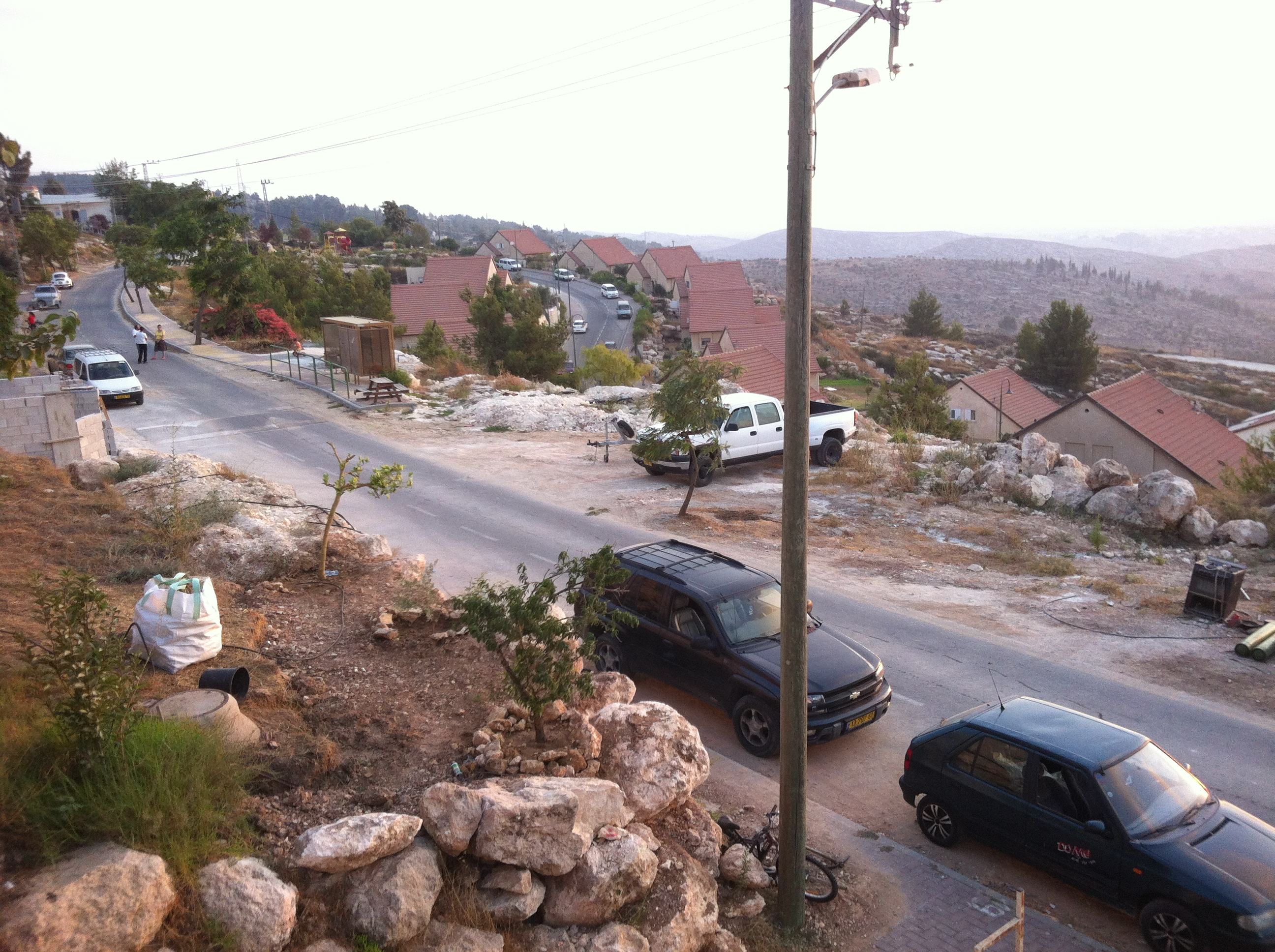
- Etymology: Furrow
- Location within the Southern West Bank
- Coordinates: 31°33′51″N 35°01′52″E
- Country: Palestine
- District: Judea and Samaria Area
- Council: Har Hevron
- Region: West Bank
- Affiliation: Mishkei Herut Beitar
- Founded: 31 January 1982
- Population (2024): 655

Telem (Hebrew: תֶּלֶם) is an Israeli settlement in the West Bank. Organized as a communal settlement, it is located in the southern Judean Hills region, west of Kiryat Arba, it falls under the jurisdiction of Har Hevron Regional Council. In 2024, it had a population of 655.

The international community considers Israeli settlements in the West Bank illegal under international law, but the Israeli government disputes this.

== Name, etymology ==
The settlement's original name was Mitzpe Guvrin, lit. 'Guvrin Lookout', since it overlooks the Beit Guvrin region.

Telem (תָּלַם) means furrow, the ridge left by a plough; or to furrow, leave a ridge.

== History ==
According to ARIJ, Israel confiscated about 1000 dunams of land from the nearby Palestinian town of Tarqumiyah in order to construct Telem.

The settlement was established on 31 January 1982 as a pioneering Nahal military outpost and demilitarized only a year later when turned over for residential purposes in the form of a non-religious cooperative village (Hebrew: מושב שיתופי, moshav shitufi) belonging to the Herut Betar movement. In 1995, with the assistance of the Amana settlement organization, houses were built.

In 2004, a group of about twenty religious families joined the village in order to strengthen and build a mixed community. In the centre of the village, a beit midrash ('house of study') was established and named the Netivot Dror Yeshiva (lit. 'Paths of Dror Yeshiva') in memory of Dror Weinberg, an Israel Defense Forces army colonel who, as of 2007, was the highest ranking Israeli soldier to be killed during the Second Intifada.

== Economy ==
As of 2008, the community still had agriculture including vineyards and chicken coops.
