= 2002 Adora terrorist attack =

Mass shooting in Adora, Israel

- Part of the Second Intifada militancy campaign
- The location of Adora, Har Hevron
- Native name: הפיגוע באדורה
- Location: Adora, Har Hevron
- Date: April 27, 2002; 24 years ago c. 9:00 am (UTC+2)
- Weapon: M16 rifles
- Deaths: 4 civilians
- Injuries: 7 civilians
- Perpetrator: Popular Front for the Liberation of Palestine
- No. of participants: 2

The 2002 Adora terrorist attack was an attack on residents of the Israeli settlement of Adora. The attack was carried out by two Palestinian militants, who entered the community on April 27, 2002, and proceeded to shoot people in their homes and in the streets. In the attack, four civilians were killed and seven were injured.

Adora is located in the Judean Mountains, in the Southern West Bank, northwest of Hebron.

== Context ==
The attack occurred during the Second Intifada. It occurred several days after Israeli forces killed the Palestinian militant, Marwan Zalloum, a leader of the Al-Aqsa Martyrs' Brigades.

== Attack ==
The attack took place in the morning on the Jewish Sabbath. Many of the Adora residents were attending Sabbath prayers in the synagogue when the attack began.

The two attackers entered the settlement by cutting a 3-foot wide hole in the security fence, but no alarm was triggered as the fence was not electrified. The attackers were wearing IDF uniforms and black flak jackets to confuse responders. They were armed with an M-17 and a Kalashnikov assault rifle. The element of surprise allowed the attackers to stay in the settlement for about 15 minutes.

Shortly after 9:00am one of the attackers entered the Shefi family house and began to search for family members room to room. He first found the 5-year-old girl Danielle Shefi in her bed, who he proceeded to shoot dead. He then found her brothers Eliad (4) and Uriel (2), who he shot and injured, then he found their mother, Shir Shefi, who he also shot and injured.

The attacker then moved to the Harari family house, where he failed to gain entry, so shot out the windows.

The second attacker attempted to gain entry to the Eliezer family home by knocking at the door, but after this failed he entered the Greenberg home, where he shot Vladimir and Katya Greenberg in their beds, killing the wife and injuring the husband.

When the local security team arrived, at first they mistook the attackers for IDF soldiers and called out to them. Responder Arik Becker was killed in the initial round of gunfire. Israeli police joined the security team, causing the attackers to flee. Ya’akov Katz was killed in a burst of gunfire while the attackers were running through the streets.

The attackers fled through a hole in the security fence in the direction of the village of Tuffah. One of the attackers was later killed by IDF troops.

The Popular Front for the Liberation of Palestine (PFLP) claimed responsibility for the attack.

== Fatalities ==
- Danielle Shefi, 5
- Arik Becker, 22
- Katrina (Katya) Greenberg, 45
- Ya'acov Katz, 51

== See also ==
- List of massacres in Palestinian Territories
