= Har Hevron Regional Council =

Coordinates: 31°26′22″N 35°1′41″E

Har Hevron הר חברון
- Regional council (from 1982)
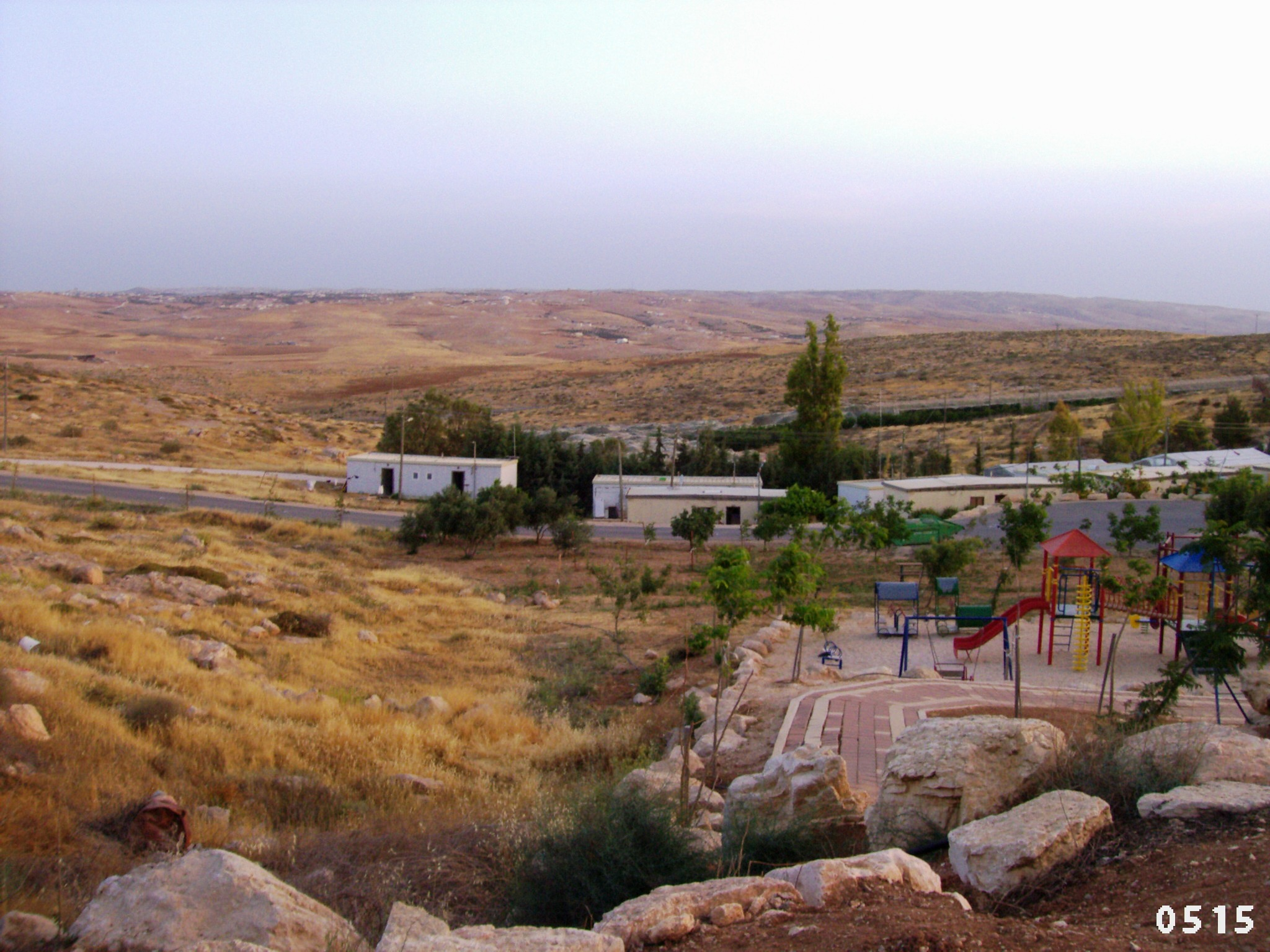

- Interactive map of Har Hevron
- Region: West Bank
- District: Judea and Samaria Area

Government
  - Head of Municipality: Eliram Azulay

Population (2024)
  - Total: 11,797
- Website: Official website

The Har Hevron Regional Council (Hebrew: מועצה אזורית הר חברון, Mo'atza Azorit Har Hevron) is an Israeli regional council in the southern Judean Hills area of Mount Hebron, in the southern West Bank, administering Israeli settlements. The headquarters are located in the Meitarim industrial zone. The council was established in 1983. The chairman of the council sines 2024 is Eliram Azulay.

While Kiryat Arba is physically located within the territory of the Har Hevron Regional Council, it is an independent town.

The council provides various municipal services to Adora, Avigayil, Beit Hagai, Beit Yatir, Carmel, Eshkolot, Livne, Ma'ale Hever, Ma'on, Mitzpe Asa'el, Negohot, Otniel, Sansana, Shim'a, Susya, Telem and Teneh Omarim.

Three of the settlements - Eshkolot, Sansana, and Beit Yatir - are in the so-called Seam Zone, on the Israeli side of the Israeli West Bank barrier, but still inside the West Bank.

== Demographics ==
Historical population
Year	Pop.	±%
1983	200	—
1995	2,400	+1100.0%
2008	5,600	+133.3%
2022	10,631	+89.8%
2024	11,797	+11.0%

== Voting Patterns ==
In the 2022 election, 90 percent of voters in the regional council voted for the parties of the right-wing coalition led by Benjamin Netanyahu, while 10 percent voted for the parties of the center-left coalition led by Yair Lapid. The Arab parties did not receive any votes.

In the 2026 election, 83 percent of voters in the regional council voted for the parties of the right-wing coalition led by Benjamin Netanyahu, while 8 percent voted for the parties of the center-left coalition led by Gadi Eisenkot and 0.02 percent voted for the Arab parties. An additional 1.7 percent voted for the Reservists, and 4.3 percent voted for Amcha Yisrael. Voter turnout increased 23 percent from the 2022 election.
