= Yeshivat Otniel shooting =

2002 mass shooting in Israel

- Part of the Second Intifada militancy campaign
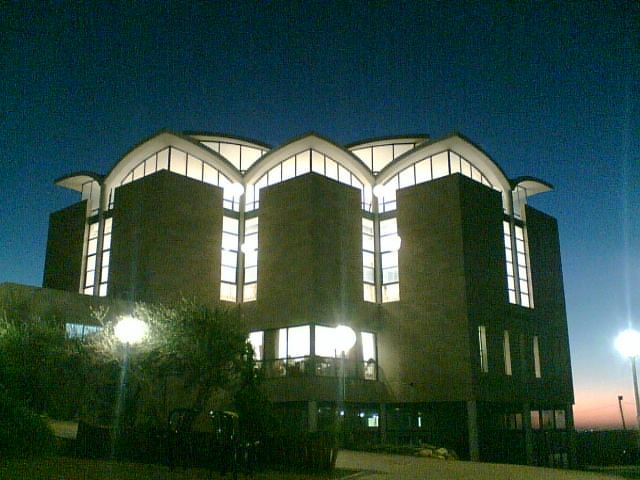
- Yeshiva Otniel

- The attack site
- Location: 31°26′16″N 35°01′35″E; Otniel, West Bank
- Date: 27 December 2002; 23 years ago 7:45 pm
- Attack type: Mass shooting
- Weapons: M16 assault rifles, hand grenades
- Deaths: 2 IDF soldiers and 2 Israeli civilians (+ 2 attackers)
- Injuries: 5 IDF soldiers, 4 Israeli civilians
- Perpetrator: Islamic Jihad claimed responsibility
- No. of participants: 2

The Yeshivat Otniel shooting, was an attack carried out on 27 December 2002, in which two Palestinian gunmen killed four students at Yeshivat Otniel, a military Hesder Yeshiva in the Israeli settlement of Otniel near Hebron in the West Bank.

== The attack ==
On Friday night, 27 December 2002, over 100 students and faculty members of Yeshivat Otniel were getting ready to have dinner in the dining room of the Yeshiva, while in the adjacent kitchen, four yeshiva students on kitchen duty organized the first course of the Sabbath meals. Two of the four students on kitchen duty were IDF soldiers on leave without pay from the army.

Meanwhile, two Palestinian militants of the Islamic Jihad, disguised as Israeli soldiers and equipped with battle vests, M16 rifles and hand grenades, made their way to the settlement through the valley located between Othniel and the town of Dahariya, and managed to infiltrate into the settlement. The militants cut the rickety fence which was erected around the building of the Yeshiva and afterwards, around 19:45 pm, they snuck into the building through the back door of the kitchen. The students on kitchen duty had just finished preparing the main dishes on serving plates and were about to bring them into the dining room when the militants entered the kitchen and opened fire at them. In the last moments of his life, Staff Sergeant Noam Apter, upon immediately realizing what was happening, managed to lock the sliding door separating the kitchen and the dining room, before he was killed by the militants. In doing so, Noam prevented the militants from entering the dining room and carrying out a far deadlier attack. Nevertheless, after killing the students on kitchen duty, the militants smashed the window of the sliding door and began shooting through it into the dining room, wounding four yeshiva students, one of them critically. The majority of the students in the dining room managed to hide underneath the tables while some of them, who were carrying weapons with them, returned fire at the militants.

During the event soldiers from Lavi Battalion rushed to the scene and waged a 30-minutes gun battle with one of the militants, who had barricaded himself in the kitchen room, before being shot dead. During the exchange of fire the second militant managed to flee the building, and ran through the valley south of the settlement towards Dahariya. Additional IDF forces from the Nahal Brigade assisted by a tracker pursued the second militant and approached him near a large quarry. The terrorist noticed the soldiers and opened fire on them, wounding three of them seriously. A gun battle was waging between the IDF force and the militant while he was hiding behind rocks and bushes. Eventually two IDF soldiers managed to charge at him simultaneously from both sides, and kill him. In total, five IDF soldiers who participated in the gun battles with the militants were injured during the exchange of fire.

== Claim of responsibility ==
The Islamic Jihad claimed responsibility for the attack. The organization's leader, Abdallah Ramadan Shalah, stated during a phone call with Al Jazeera that the attack was carried out in retaliation for the assassination of the organization's West Bank militia leader a day earlier in Qabatya, near Hebron.

== Israel's reaction ==
After the attack, The IDF placed Hebron and three nearby villages under curfew. In addition, as a result of the terrorist attack, Israeli Prime Minister Ariel Sharon told his cabinet that he and Defense Minister Shaul Mofaz had forged an agreement to ramp up the war against terrorism.

As part of the IDF's policy of deterring Palestinian terrorists from carrying out attacks, on the night of 30 December 2002 an IDF force demolished the homes of Ahmed Faqih, 20, and Mohammed Shaheen, 20, who carried out the attack in Otniel, which were located in the village of Dura.
