= LaMar C. Berrett =

LaMar C. Berrett (March 28, 1926 – August 25, 2007) was an American professor of religion at Brigham Young University (BYU). He was a member of the Church of Jesus Christ of Latter-day Saints.

== Biography ==
Berrett was born in Riverton, Utah. He joined the United States Army in 1944 and fought in the Battle of the Bulge during World War II. After the war, he served as an LDS missionary in the Southern States Mission. He earned his bachelor's degree from the University of Utah and a master's degree from Brigham Young University (BYU). He also held an Ed.D. from BYU.

Berrett worked as an LDS seminary teacher in Copperton, Utah and Heber City, Utah, then he was a BYU religion professor for 29 years. He was a tour guide in Israel and travelled the world. He married Darlene Hamilton in the Salt Lake Temple in 1950 and they had nine children.

== Publications ==
Berrett wrote Discovering the World of the Bible (BYU Press, 1973). He edited six volumes in the Sacred Places series about specific locations connected with the history of the LDS Church. He also wrote Holy Places: A History of Latter-day Saints in the Near East.
