= Re'em Ha'Cohen =

Religious Zionist rabbi (born 1957)

Rabbi Re'em HaCohen רא"ם הכהן
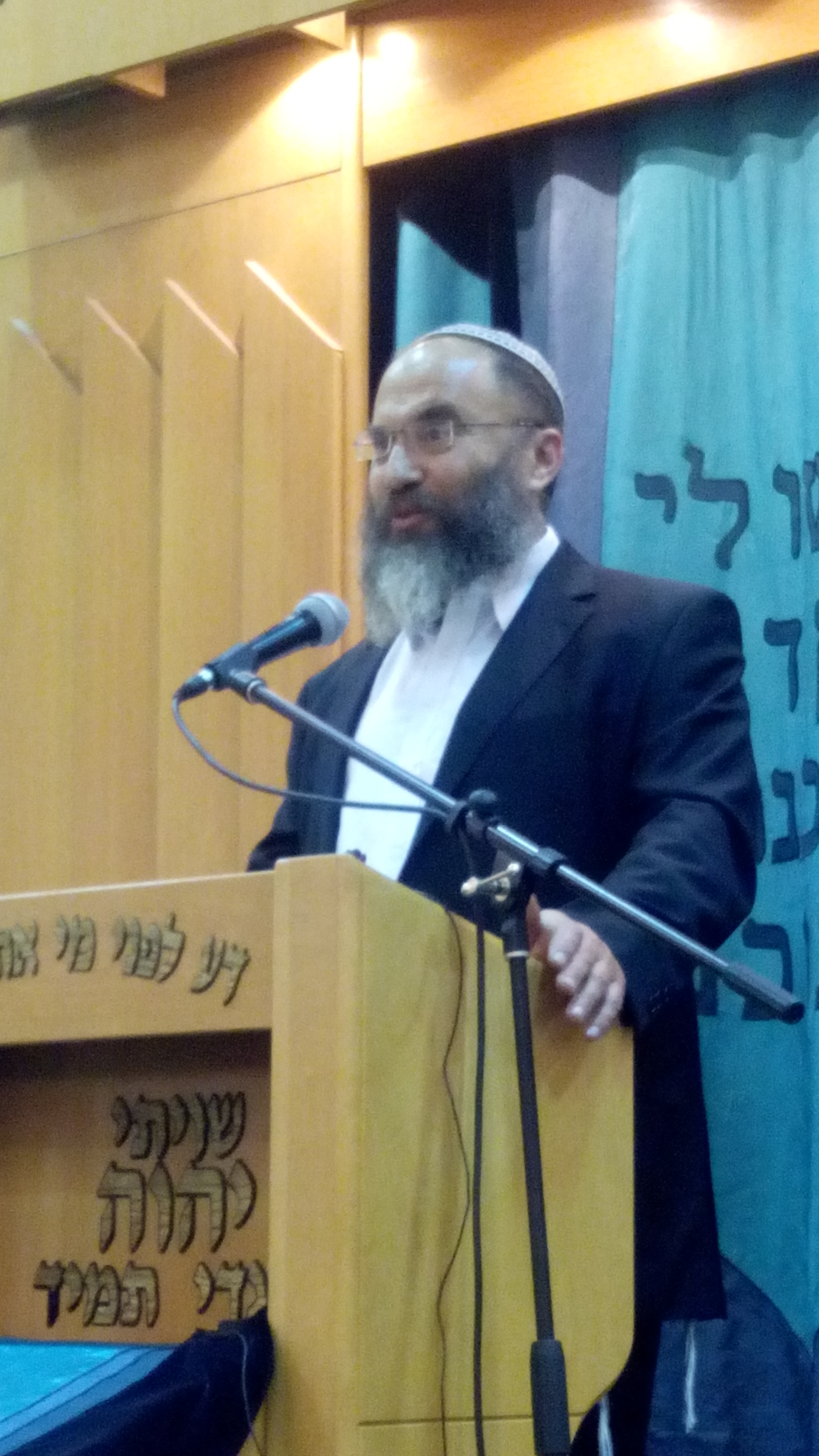
- Rabbi Re'em HaCohen
- Title: Rosh Yeshiva of Yeshivat Otniel

Personal life
- Born: 10 March 1957 (age 69) Jerusalem

Religious life
- Religion: Judaism
- Denomination: Orthodox

Rabbi Re'em HaCohen (Hebrew: רא"ם הכהן; born 1 March 1957; 25 Adar I 5717) is an Israeli Religious Zionist rabbi. HaCohen is the Rosh yeshiva of Yeshivat Otniel (together with Rabbi Binyamin Kalmanzon) and the rabbi of the Israeli settlement of Otniel.

== Biography ==
Re'em HaCohen was born in Jerusalem on 1 March 1957 to Yedaya, a principal at Yeshivat Har Etzion and son of Zionist thinker Shmuel HaCohen Weingarten (he), and Dina, head of Midreshet Emuna and daughter of Zionist pioneer Natan Gardi (he). He was named after his great-grandfather, Rabbi Avraham Mordechai. He grew up on the border of Jerusalem's Rehavia and Sha'arei Hesed neighbourhoods. In his youth, Hacohen would frequently visit the house of Rabbi Shlomo Zalman Auerbach.

He studied at Netiv Meir Yeshiva High School under Rabbis Arye Bina and David Fuchs, and after that at Yeshivat Har Etzion in Alon Shvut under Rabbis Aharon Lichtenstein and Yehuda Amital. He served in the Israeli Armoured Corps and advanced to the rank of Major in the Reserves. HaCohen received semikhah from Rabbi Lichtenstein and Rabbi Eliezer Waldenberg (author of the halachic treatise Tzitz Eliezer). He also studied with Rabbi Sholom Eisen, a posek in the Edah HaChareidis.

HaCohen served as a Ra"m at Yeshivat Or Etzion under Rabbi Haim Drukman and at Yeshivat Shvut Yisrael in Efrat. In 1994, he was invited by rabbis Binyamin Kalmanzon and Ami Ulami to be a Rosh Yeshiva at Yeshivat Otniel. After Ulami was murdered that year, HaCohen became the community rabbi of the town of Otniel.

In the past, Rabbi HaCohen worked with the organisation "Circles of Justice". In 2006, he was nominated for the post of Chief Rabbi of the IDF.

He serves on the judging panel of "Kane Lecha Chaver", a Torah competition run by Mifal HaPayis.

=== Family ===
Rabbi HaCohen and his wife Noa have 9 children. His son, Rabbi Uri HaCohen, is a Ra"m at Yeshivat Otniel. Another son, Lt. Col. Yoni HaCohen, is the commander of the IDF Paratrooper's 890th "Efah" Battalion .

His oldest brother is Major-General Gershon HaCohen, a senior IDF officer. His other brothers are Rabbi Elyashiv HaCohen, Rosh yeshiva at Yeshivat Beit Shmuel in Hadera, Rabbi Aviya HaCohen, Ra"m at Yeshivat Tekoa, and Rabbi Chayim HaCohen, head of the Beit Yatir pre-army program. His brother-in-law is Rabbi Aharon Harel, head of Lev Chadash Yeshiva High School in Shilo.

== Opinions and philosophy ==
According to Rabbi HaCohen, the learning in the beit midrash must be connected to the outside world, as the inner parts of the Torah must be connected to the outer parts. For this reason, his teaching references many different sources ranging from academic and professional, to halachic and kabbalistic sources. Rabbi HaCohen's educational philosophy is characterised by contemplative independence. As a student of Rabbi Lichtenstein, he uses the Brisker method of learning Talmud. He is a student of Kabbalah, especially the teachings of the Ramchal, Chabad (in particular the Baal HaTanya) and Menahem Azariah da Fano. The teachings of Rav Kook are also central to his philosophy, particularly as they are interpreted by Rabbi David Cohen.

Rabbi HaCohen rules that it is in theory halachically binding to donate one's organs and have an organ donor card, which must say "Organs can only be used with the approval of a Rabbi chosen by the family". He further states that any Rabbi would in fact withhold such approval, unless doctors in the future demonstrate adherence to Halachic "Moment of Death" standards, which according to Rabbi HaCohen is not yet the case. He forbids smoking as a form of suicide. He requires his followers to wear techelet.

== Works ==
- Badai Ha-Aron- Talmudic insights
- He'elem veGilui - on the revelation of God, from Creation to the Second Tablets
- Kol Damamah and LaRahok ve Karov- on the High Holy Days
- Benai Neviim - the meaning of prophecy for our era
- Reeh ve-Yirah - Abraham and Isaac for our time
- Derekh Sha'ar Elyon - on the sacrificial tractate and the Temple Service
