= Otniel =

Israeli settlement in the West Bank

Otniel: עָתְנִיאֵל (Hebrew)
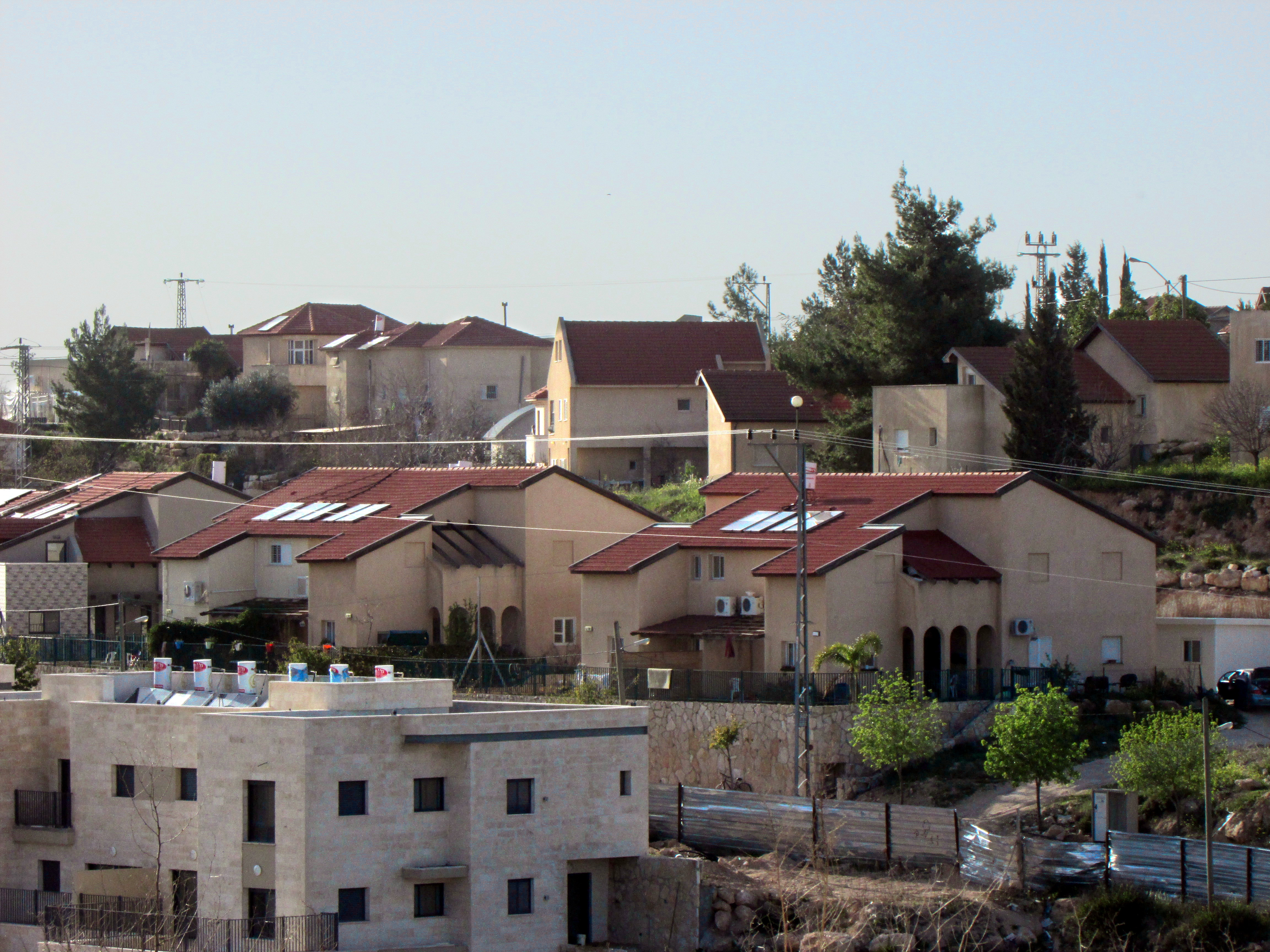

- Location within the Southern West Bank
- Coordinates: 31°26′23″N 35°01′44″E
- Country: Palestine
- District: Judea and Samaria Area
- Council: Har Hevron
- Region: West Bank
- Affiliation: Amana
- Founded: 1983
- Population (2024): 1,014

Otniel (Hebrew: עָתְנִיאֵל) is an Orthodox Israeli settlement in the West Bank. Located in the southern Judaean Mountains, south of Hebron, it falls under the jurisdiction of Har Hevron Regional Council. In 2024, it had a population of 1,014.

Otniel is named after the first biblical judge of Israel, Othniel Ben Kenaz; the settlement is located between the Palestinian cities of Yatta and Dahariya, adjacent to Highway 60, which connects Jerusalem and Be'er Sheva.

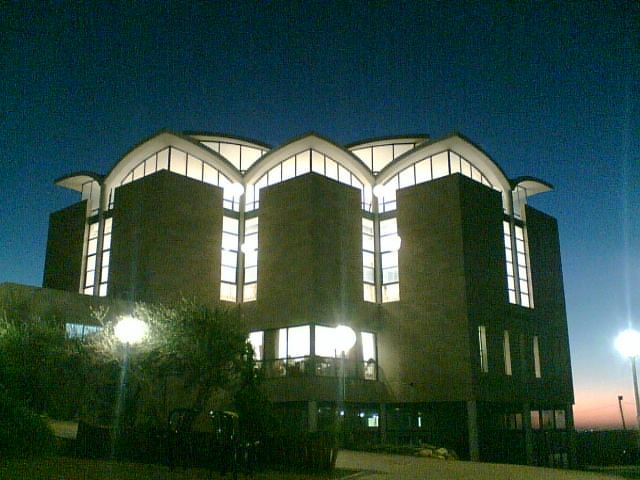
Yeshiva of Otniel at night time

Othniel serves as a regional center in the Hebron Hills and hosts numerous educational institutions: a Hesder Yeshiva, a high school yeshiva, a middle school, and a regional elementary school for the children of the settlement and the surrounding area. The nearby Jewish settlements to Othniel are Beit Hagai to the north and Shim'a and Mitzpe Eshtemoa to the south.

The international community considers Israeli settlements in the West Bank illegal under international law, but the Israeli government disputes this.

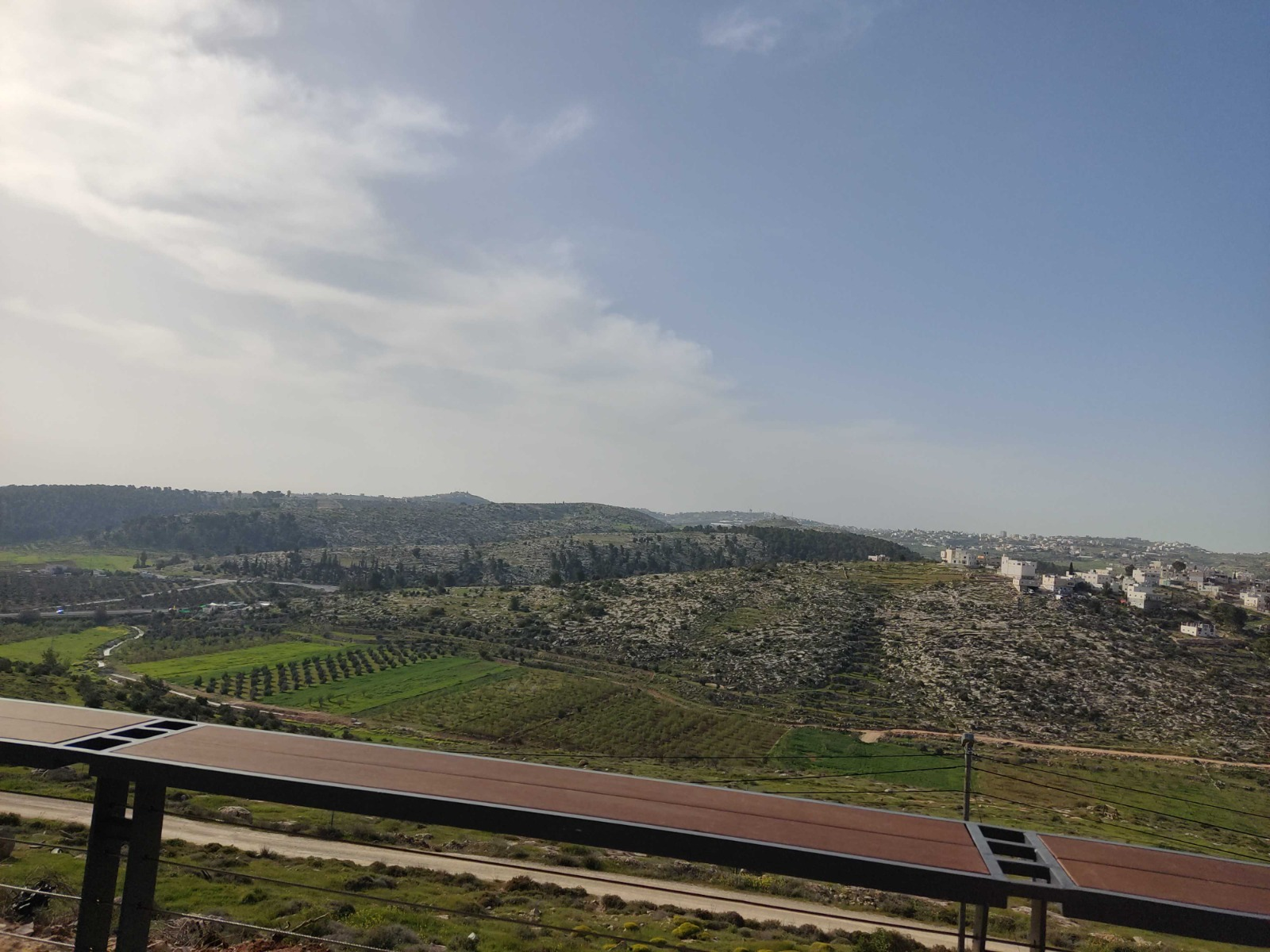
The view from the Otniel settlement

== History ==
The settlement was established in 1983 south of Beit Hagai and north of Shim'a and the Palestinian villages of as-Samu, Yatta and ad-Dhahiriya. The settlement is named after the Biblical judge Otniel Ben Knaz.

== Status under international law ==
The international community considers all Israeli settlements in the West Bank to violate the Fourth Geneva Convention's prohibition on the transfer of an occupying power's civilian population into occupied territory. Israel disputes that the Fourth Geneva Convention applies to the Palestinian territories as they had not been legally held by a sovereign prior to Israel taking control of them. This view has been rejected by the International Court of Justice and the International Committee of the Red Cross.

== Access ==
Otniel is served by Highway 60 (Israel–Palestine), a major north-south highway in the West Bank.

Entry to Beersheba via Highway 60 is controlled by the Meitar Israeli checkpoint, where green (Palestinian Authority) registered vehicles are barred from access.

== Arab-Israeli conflict ==
Due to its geographic proximity to the Israeli–Palestinian conflict in Hebron, Otniel has been the site of a number of violent incidents.

In December 2002, four students were killed and ten were wounded by Palestinian gunmen in a shooting attack on Otniel's IDF-affiliated yeshiva.

In November 2011, an Otniel resident, Rabbi Dan Mertzbach, was killed, and two women were wounded, when an Israel Defense Forces patrol fired on their car as they drove to the Cave of the Patriarchs to pray in the early hours of the morning.

In January 2016, a Palestinian entered the home of Dafna Meir and stabbed her to death in front of her three children.

In July 2016, Michael Marc, a resident of Otniel, was killed and members of his family wounded in a drive-by shooting at Adorayim Junction near Otniel and Hebron. The shooter, Muhammad Faqih (aged 29) from Dura, was later arrested.

== Notable residents ==
- Yehuda Glick (b. 1965), Rabbi and politician
- Yakov Nagen (b. 1967), Rabbi and activist
- Re'em Ha'Cohen (b. 1957), Rabbi of Otniel
- Orit Mark Ettinger (b. 1999), media professional
