= Livne =

Israeli settlement in the West Bank

Livne: לִבְנֶה, ליבנה (Hebrew)

Hebrew transcription(s)
  - Standard: Livneh
  - Unofficial: Livna
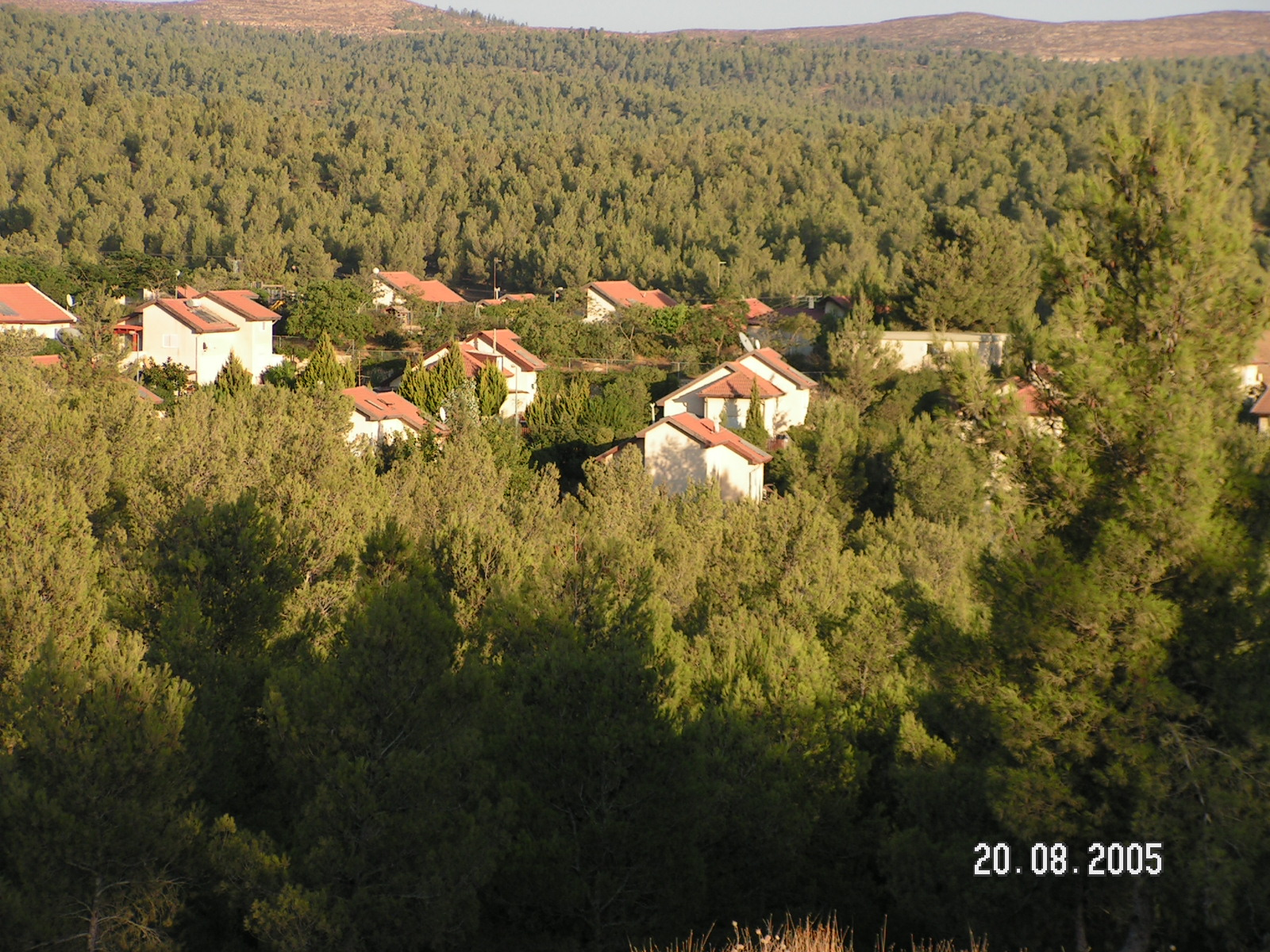

- Location within the Southern West Bank
- Coordinates: 31°21′21″N 35°4′12″E
- Country: Israel
- District: Judea and Samaria Area
- Council: Har Hevron
- Region: West Bank
- Affiliation: Amana
- Founded: 1982
- Population (2024): 448
- Website: shani-livna.org

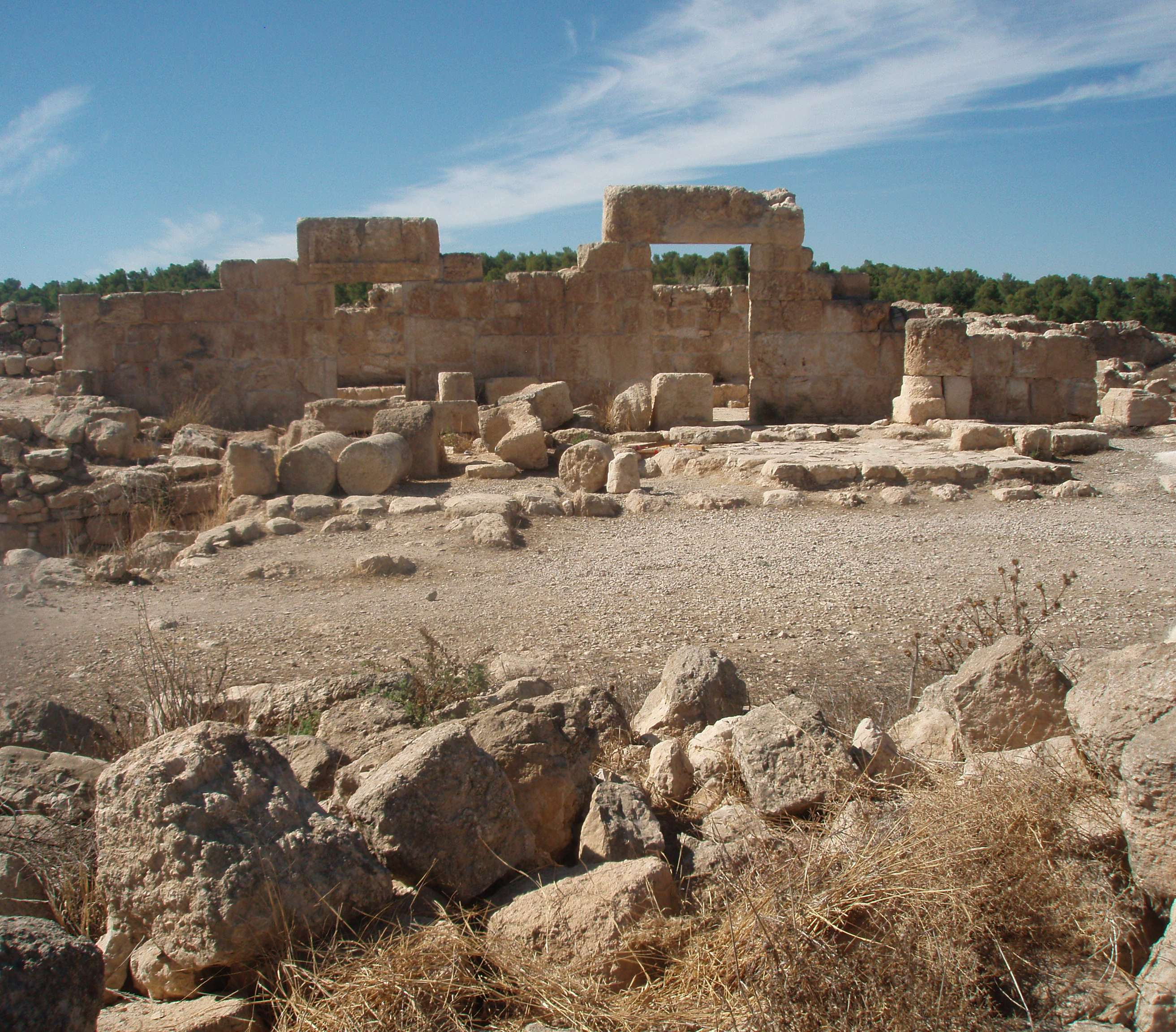
Ruins of Hurvat Anim ancient synagogue near Shani-Livne

Livne (Hebrew: לִבְנֶה, lit. 'Birch'), also known as Shani (Hebrew: שָׁנִי, lit. 'Scarlet') is an Israeli settlement. Located in the southern Judaean Mountains, straddling the Green Line and therefore partly in Israel and partly in the West Bank, it is organised as a community settlement and falls under the jurisdiction of Har Hevron Regional Council. In 2024 it had a population of 448. It is located on the outskirts of Yatir Forest, on the Israeli side of the West Bank Barrier.

The international community considers Israeli settlements in the West Bank illegal under international law, but the Israeli government disputes this.

== Name ==
Livne is named after biblical Livna (Hebrew לבנה) and was allocated to the priests (kohanim) (Book of Joshua 21:13).

== History ==
Modern-day Shani-Livne was established in 1982, with residents moving into permanent housing in 1989. The community was renamed Shani in memory of Shani Shacham, the son of former members killed in the line of duty.

== Economy ==
Residents work in Beer Sheva, Arad, at the Dead Sea Works, communities of the Har Hevron Regional Council, and in the central region. The Yatir region is known among Israelis for its grapes and wine.
