= Yeshivat Otniel =

Coordinates: 31.4384°N 35.0268°E

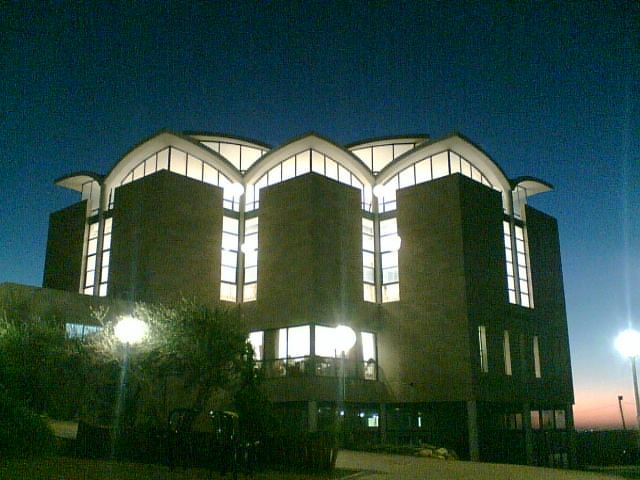
Yeshivat Otniel

Yeshivat Otniel is a hesder yeshiva located in Otniel, an Israeli settlement in the West Bank. It is co-headed by the Rabbis Benni Kalmanzon and Re'em Ha'Cohen, who also serves as the settlement's rabbi.

It began in 1987 as a kollel run by Rabbis Ami Ulami (killed by terrorists in 1994) and Kalmanzon. Over the next few years, it grew to be a full hesder yeshiva. Rabbi Re'em Ha'Cohen joined the yeshiva in 1993. It adheres to a Religious Zionism ("Dati Leumi") philosophy, with a strong emphasis on Hasidic thought and an encouragement of artistic expression.

On December 27, 2002, two Islamic Jihad terrorists infiltrated the yeshiva's dining room and killed four of the yeshiva's students.

On January 17, 2016, a Palestinian terrorist infiltrated the settlement and stabbed Dafne Meir, a woman living in the settlement, to death in her home leaving her six children behind.

Today, Yeshivat Otniel is one of the largest hesder yeshivas, with roughly 350 students.

== Notable faculty ==
Rabbi Dr. Yakov Nagen - author of multiple works on philosophy and Talmud, an interfaith activist, and director of the Blickle Institute for Interfaith Dialogue and the Beit Midrash for Judaism and Humanity.

== Notable alumni ==
Amichai Chasson - Israeli poet, author, journalist, film director, screenwriter, and artistic director.

Arnon Segal - Israeli journalist and Temple Mount activist.

Naftali Abramson - Jewish folk-rock musician and mental health therapist.

Ofer Hadad - Israeli journalist

Yehuda Glick - Member of the 20th Knesset on behalf of the Likud Party.

Rav Yair HaLevi - Rosh Yeshiva of YTVA Chovat Hatalmidim
