= Shim'a =

Israeli settlement in the West Bank

Shim'a: שִׁמְעָה / יוֹנָדָב (Hebrew)

Hebrew transcription(s)
  - Official: Yonadav
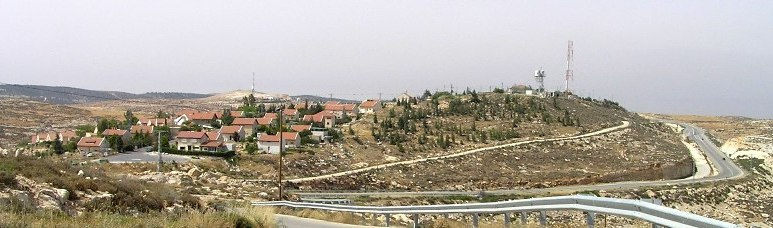

- Location within the Southern West Bank
- Coordinates: 31°23′16″N 35°0′46″E
- Country: Palestine
- District: Judea and Samaria Area
- Council: Har Hevron
- Region: West Bank
- Affiliation: Amana
- Founded: 1982
- Population (2024): 1,060

Shim'a (Hebrew: שִׁמְעָה), also Yonadav (Hebrew: יוֹנָדָב), is an Israeli settlement in the West Bank, along the Green Line south of Livne and Teneh Omarim. Located on a hill 600 metres above sea level, it is organised as a community settlement and falls under the jurisdiction of Har Hevron Regional Council. In 2024 it had a population of 1,060.

The international community considers Israeli settlements in the West Bank illegal under international law, but the Israeli government disputes this.

== Name ==
Shim'a/Yonadav is named after King David's brother Shimeah and his son Jonadab (2 Samuel 13:3).

== History ==
The settlement was first established in 1982 as a pioneer Nahal military outpost, and demilitarized when turned over to residential purposes in 1988. As of 2015, Shim'a had approximately 600 residents.
