= Kiryat Arba =

Israeli settlement in the West Bank

Kiryat Arba: קִרְיַת־אַרְבַּע; قرية أربع
- Local council

Hebrew transcription(s)
  - ISO 259: Qiryat ʔarbaˁ
  - Also spelled: Qiryat Arba (official)
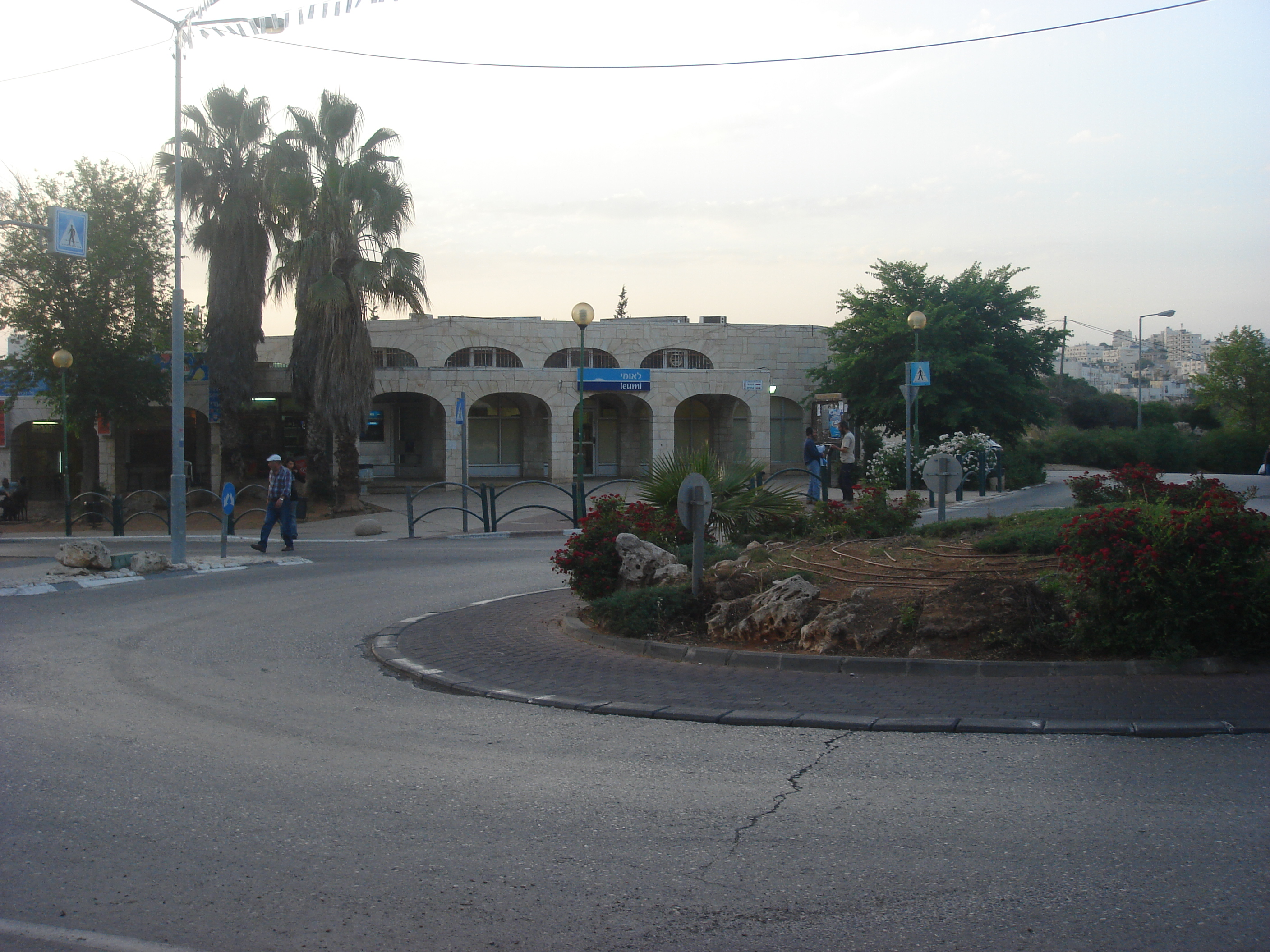

- Location within the Southern West Bank
- Coordinates: 31°31′42″N 35°7′7″E
- Region: West Bank
- District: Judea and Samaria Area
- Founded: 1968–1971

Government
  - Head of Municipality: Israel Bramson

Area
  - Total: 4,386 dunams (4.386 km^{2}; 1.693 sq mi)

Population (2024)
  - Total: 7,698
  - Density: 1,755/km^{2} (4,546/sq mi)
- Name meaning: Town of the Four [Giants]
- Website: Official website

Kiryat Arba or Qiryat Arba (Hebrew: קִרְיַת־אַרְבַּע, lit. 'Town of Arba [biblical giant]') is an urban Israeli settlement on the outskirts of Hebron, in the southern Israeli-occupied West Bank. Founded in 1968, in 2024 it had a population of 7,698.

The international community considers Israeli settlements in the West Bank illegal under international law, but the Israeli government disputes this.

== Etymology ==
The modern settlement derives its name from a Kiryat Arba mentioned in the Hebrew Bible as the former name of Hebron and as the place where Abraham's wife, Sarah, has died: "And Sarah died at Kiriath-arba (that is, Hebron)" (Genesis 23:2). The Book of Joshua says: "Now the name of Hebron formerly was Kiriath-arba; this Arba was the greatest man among the Anakim." (Joshua 14:15). It is also one of the places listed in Nehemiah where some of the people of Judah were living. There is no reference to Hebron in Nehemiah, however.

There are various explanations for the name, not mutually exclusive. According to the biblical commentator Rashi, Kiryat Arba ("Town of Arba") means either the town (kirya) of Arba, the giant who had three sons, or the town of the four giants: Anak (the son of Arba) and his three sons – Ahiman, Sheshai and Talmai – who are described as being the sons of a "giant" in Numbers 13:22: "On the way through the Negev, they (Joshua and Caleb) came to Hebron where [they saw] Ahiman, Sheshai and Talmi, descendants of the Giant (ha-anak)..."

== History ==
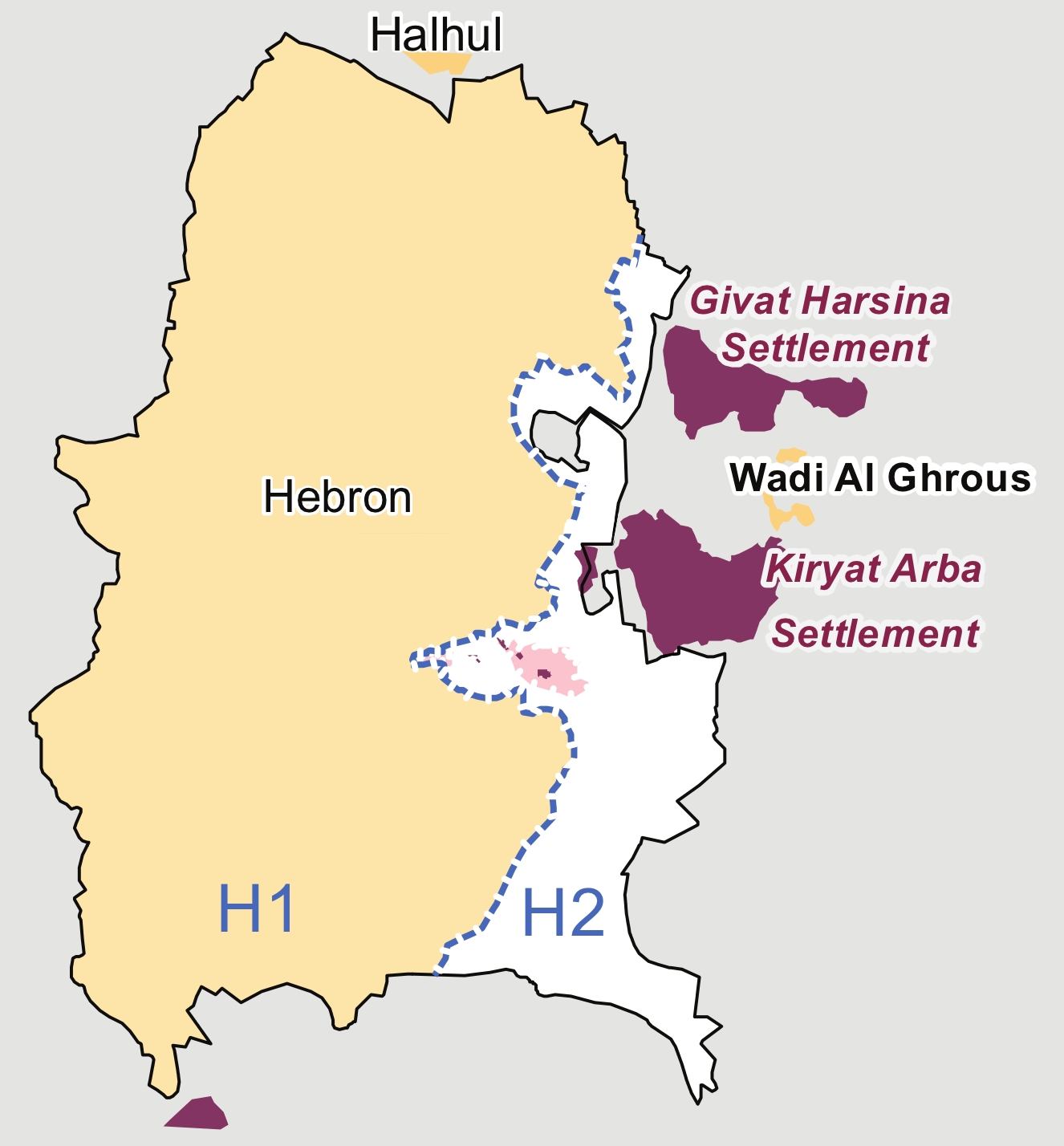
Israeli settlement in Hebron

A secret government plan to establish the settlement began with the expropriation of Palestinian land, ostensibly for a military base. According to the minutes of a meeting between senior officials in the office of Defense Minister Moshe Dayan in July 1970, houses would be constructed "for military purposes" before being turned over to Israeli civilians as a settlement. This method of settlement foundation, which was very common at the time, was intended to give the appearance of compliance with international law. Israeli settlers claimed that Israeli settlement around Hebron was justified in light of the 1929 Hebron massacre and the continuous Jewish presence in the area until then. The town is a self-sufficient community, with pre-nursery through post-secondary educational institutions, medical facilities, shopping centers, a bank, and a post office. Kiryat Arba attained local council status in 1979. While Kiryat Arba is located within the territory of the Har Hebron Regional Council, it is an independent local council.

Israeli settlers living at Kiryat Arba have been targets of multiple attacks by Palestinians. In 1980, three 20-year-old yeshiva students studying in Kiryat Arba were among the six Jews killed by terrorists after praying in the Cave of the Patriarchs in Hebron on Friday night. Between 1981 and 1986, four people from Kiryat Arba were shot and wounded in the Hebron marketplace. In 1994, a 17-year Sarit Prigral from Kiryat Arba was shot and killed in a drive-by shooting. In March 2003, Eli and Dina Horowitz were shot to death in their home and five others wounded. On 26 November 2009, a Palestinian stabbed and wounded two Israelis at a Kiryat Arba gas station. The Palestinian was then shot dead by an Israeli soldier. On 31 August 2010, four residents, including a pregnant woman, were shot to death in their car by Hamas militants outside Kiryat Arba. The Palestinian Authority arrested the perpetrators, but promptly released them after Hamas accused it of treason. On 8 October 2010, Israeli troops killed two of the perpetrators and arrested six during a raid in Hebron. In October 2011, a Palestinian stoning attack near Kiryat Arba caused the car of a resident to overturn, killing him and his infant son. The man's handgun and wallet were then stolen. Following an investigation by Shin Bet, the IDF and police, two Palestinians from Halhul were arrested for throwing the stones that caused the car to overturn, and three others were arrested for stealing the gun. On 30 June 2016, a Palestinian from the nearby village of Bani Naim entered a house in Kiryat Arba and stabbed to death 13-year-old Hallel Yaffa Ariel, an Israeli-American girl. The attacker was shot to death, after also wounding a security guard who responded to the Ariel stabbing.

In October 2018, Eliyahu Libman was elected council head beating Malachi Levinger, the son of Moshe Levinger, who had served as head of council for 10 years.

== Landmarks ==
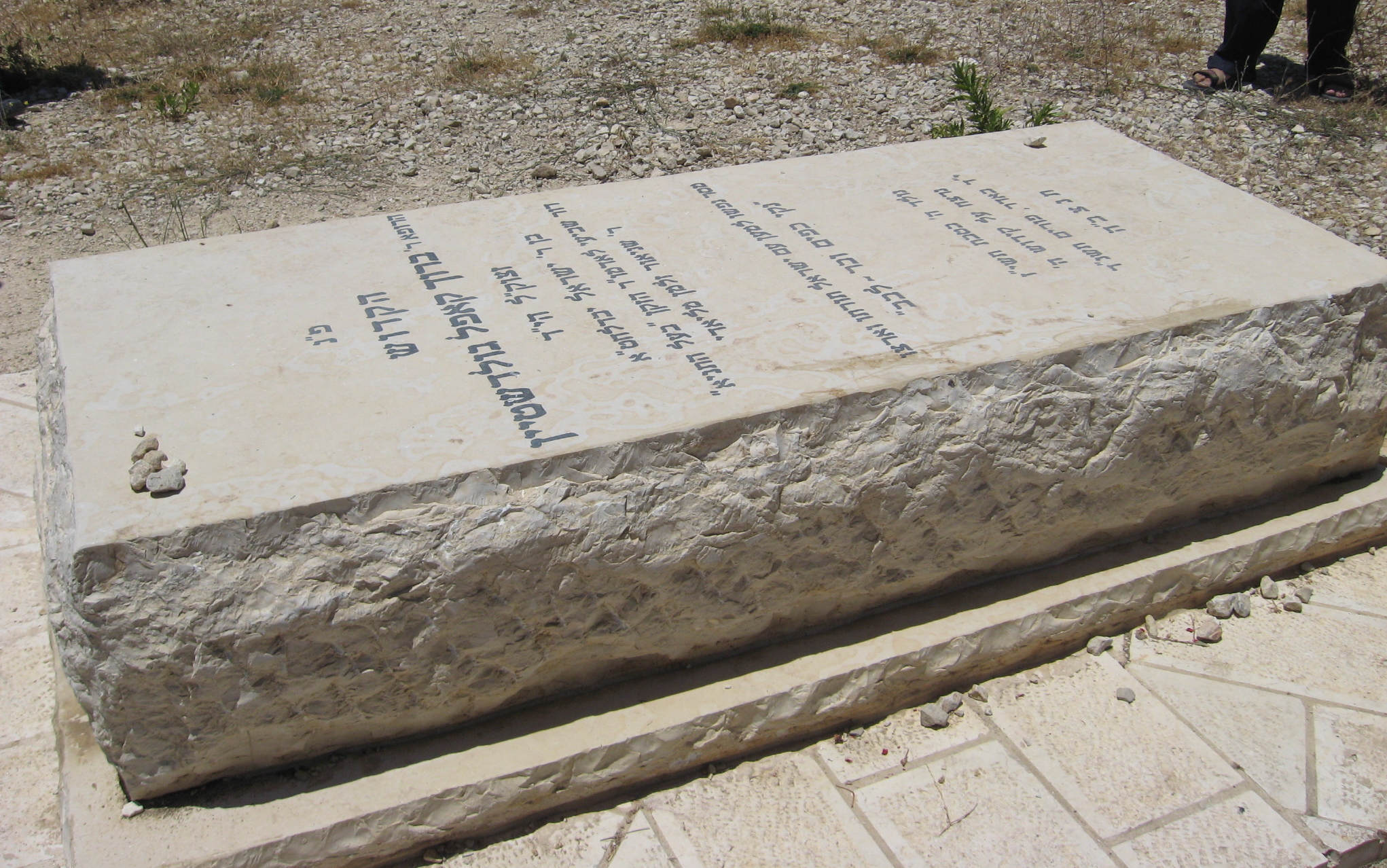
Tomb of the Kach supporter and perpetrator of the 1994 Cave of the Patriarchs massacre against Palestinian worshipers, Baruch Goldstein, located at the Meir Kahane Park in Kiryat Arba

- Kahane Park is named for Rabbi Meir Kahane, founder of Kach, a radical Orthodox Jewish, ultranationalist political party in Israel that is banned and considered a terrorist organization in Israel. Meir Kahane was assassinated in the United States by an Arab gunman.
- The grave of Baruch Goldstein, who committed the Cave of the Patriarchs massacre, is across the street from the park.

== Education ==
The settlement has the following high schools and yeshivas:

- The Kiryat Arba Ulpana for girls.
- The Kiryat Arba high school Yeshiva.
- The Nir Hesder Yeshiva.

== Local government ==
=== Heads of the local council ===
- Eliyahu Libman (–2024)
- Israel Bramson (2024–present)

== Voting patterns ==
In the 2022 election, 93 percent of voters in Kiryat Arba voted for the parties of the right-wing coalition led by Benjamin Netanyahu, while 5 percent voted for the parties of the center-left coalition led by Yair Lapid and 0.03 percent voted for the Arab parties. 67 percent of voters voted for the Religious Zionist Party-Otzma Yehudit list.

In the 2026 election, 90 percent of voters in Kiryat Arba voted for the parties of the right-wing coalition led by Benjamin Netanyahu, while 4 percent voted for the parties of the center-left coalition led by Gadi Eisenkot and 0.03 percent voted for the Arab parties. An additional 0.9 percent voted for the Reservists, and 1.2 percent voted for Amcha Yisrael. Voter turnout increased 12 percent from the 2022 election.

== Notable residents ==
- Sarah Avraham (b. 1993/94), Indian-born Israeli kickboxer, 2014 Women's World Thai-Boxing Champion at 57-63 kilos (125–140 pounds)
- Baruch Goldstein (1956-1994), perpetrator of the Cave of the Patriarchs Massacre
- Elyakim Ha'etzni (1926-2022), lawyer and former Knesset member
- Moshe Levinger (1935-2015), Orthodox rabbi and Religious Zionist activist
- Dov Lior (b. 1933), chief rabbi and rosh yeshiva
- Itamar Ben-Gvir (b. 1976), Knesset member and Minister of National Security
