= Fahma =

- Municipality type D (Village council)

Arabic transcription(s)
  - Arabic: فحمة
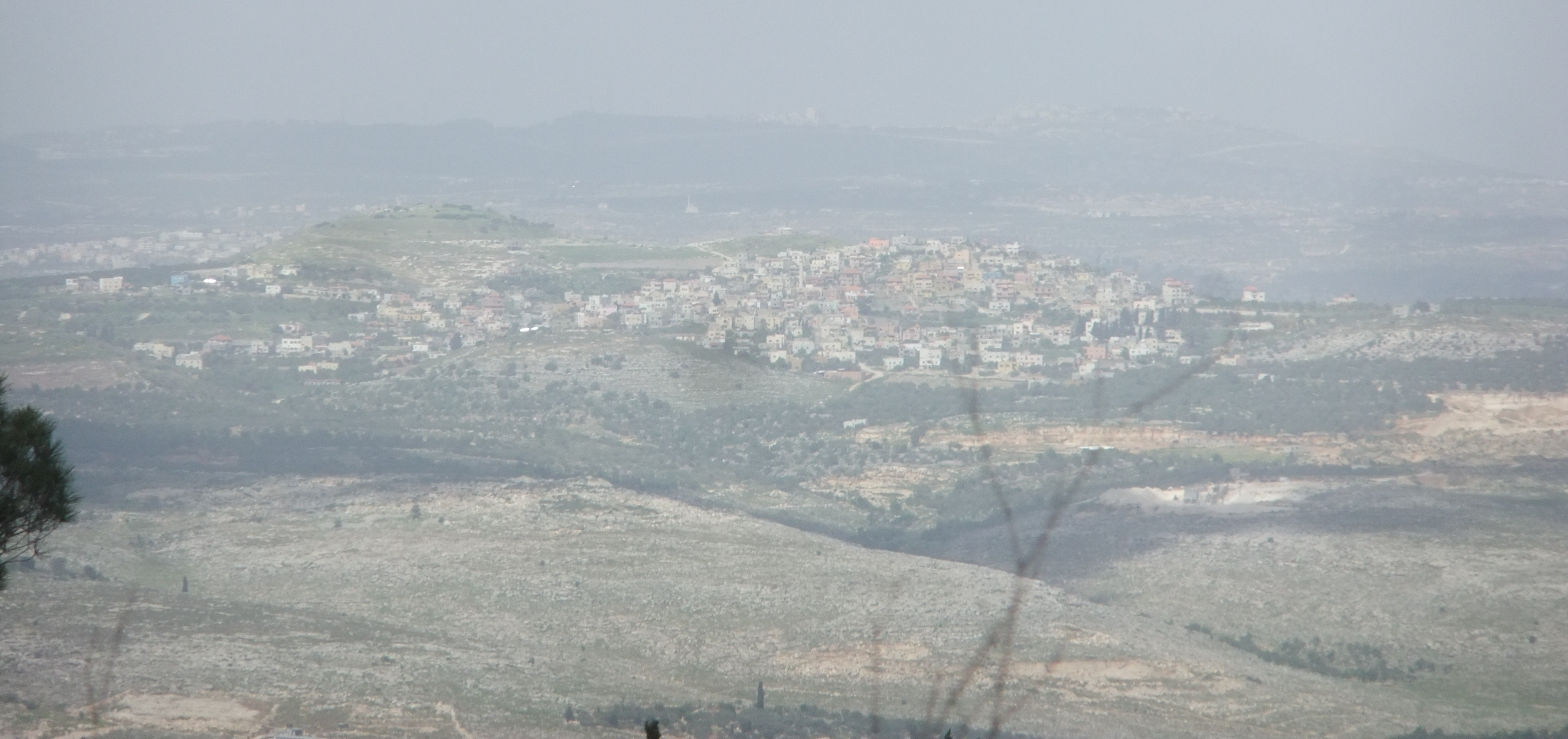
- Fahma

- Location of Fahma within Palestine
- Coordinates: 32°23′00″N 35°10′46″E
- Palestine grid: 167/198
- State: Palestine
- Governorate: Jenin

Government
  - Type: Village council

Population (2017)
  - Total: 3,193
- Name meaning: The charcoal

Fahma (Arabic: فحمة) is a Palestinian town in the Jenin Governorate of the State of Palestine in the western area of the West Bank, located 15 kilometers southwest of Jenin. According to the Palestinian Central Bureau of Statistics, the town had a population of 2,439 inhabitants in mid-year 2006 and 3,193 by 2017.

== History ==
Pottery sherds from early and late Roman, Byzantine, and early Islamic periods have been found here.

In 1941, a carved stone with a relief of a Torah ark was discovered near the village's mosque, which previously was a Crusader church. This finding led scholars to believe that Fahma was a Samaritan settlement during Late Antiquity, and that the church and mosque stand on the site of an earlier Samaritan synagogue.

Just north of the former church lays a half-destroyed vaulted building, which has an opening with a lintel on the south side, it is possible the basement of a hall house, dating to the Crusader era.

In 1179 the village was mentioned together with Ajjah (named Casale Age) in Crusader sources as being among the villages whose revenue were given to the Zion Abbey by Pope Alexander III.

In the Mamluk era, it was a station on the road between Damascus and Cairo, used for the express bringing of snow. It also had beacons for conveying messages.

=== Ottoman era ===
Fahma, like the rest of Palestine, was incorporated into the Ottoman Empire in 1517, and in the census of 1596 it was a part of the nahiya ("subdistrict") of Jabal Sami which was under the administration of the liwa ("district") of Nablus. The village had a population of 21 households and 2 bachelors, all Muslim. The villagers paid a fixed tax-rate of 33,3% on agricultural products, such as wheat, barley, summer crops, olive trees, beehives and/or goats, in addition to occasional revenues, a poll tax, and a press for olive oil or grape syrup; a total of 6,000 akçe. Pottery sherd from the early Ottoman era have also been found here.

In 1694, Abd el-Ghani, a Muslim traveler, passed by Famah on his pilgrimage.

In 1838, Fahmeh was noted as being in the District of esh-Sha'rawiyeh esh-Shurkiyeh, the eastern part.

In 1870/1871 (1288 AH), an Ottoman census listed the village in the nahiya (sub-district) of al-Sha'rawiyya al-Sharqiyya.

In 1882, the PEF's Survey of Western Palestine described Fahmeh as a small adobe hamlet; "on a saddle beneath the hill (Batnen Nury). It has a well and a fig garden towards the north."

=== British Mandate era ===
In the 1922 census of Palestine, conducted by the British Mandate authorities, Fahmeh had a population of 187; all Muslims, increasing in the 1931 census to 238; still all Muslims, in a total of 38 houses.

In the 1945 statistics Fahma had a population of 350 Muslims, and the jurisdiction of the village was 4,498 dunams of land, according to an official land and population survey. Of this, 210 dunams were used for plantations and irrigable land, 2,173 dunams for cereals, while 14 dunams were built-up (urban) land.

=== Jordanian era ===
In the wake of the 1948 Arab–Israeli War, and after the 1949 Armistice Agreements, Fahma came under Jordanian rule.

The Jordanian census of 1961 found 541 inhabitants in Fahma.

=== Post 1967 ===
Since the Six-Day War in 1967, Fahma has been under Israeli occupation.

The village mosque is a former church, and it includes some elements (a stone door), possibly from a 3rd or 4th century Samaritan synagogue.

== Demography ==
=== Origin ===
Some residents of Fahma have their origins in Yatta and as-Samu', both located in the south Hebron Mountain.

== Bibliography ==
- Barron, J.B., ed. (1923). Palestine: Report and General Abstracts of the Census of 1922. Government of Palestine.
- Conder, C.R.; Kitchener, H.H. (1882). The Survey of Western Palestine: Memoirs of the Topography, Orography, Hydrography, and Archaeology. Vol. 2. London: Committee of the Palestine Exploration Fund.
- Government of Jordan, Department of Statistics (1964). First Census of Population and Housing. Volume I: Final Tables; General Characteristics of the Population (PDF).
- Government of Palestine, Department of Statistics (1945). Village Statistics, April, 1945.
- Hadawi, S. (1970). Village Statistics of 1945: A Classification of Land and Area ownership in Palestine. Palestine Liberation Organization Research Center.
- Hütteroth, W.-D.; Abdulfattah, K. (1977). Historical Geography of Palestine, Transjordan and Southern Syria in the Late 16th Century. Erlanger Geographische Arbeiten, Sonderband 5. Erlangen, Germany: Vorstand der Fränkischen Geographischen Gesellschaft. ISBN 3-920405-41-2.
- Mills, E., ed. (1932). Census of Palestine 1931. Population of Villages, Towns and Administrative Areas. Jerusalem: Government of Palestine.
- Palmer, E.H. (1881). The Survey of Western Palestine: Arabic and English Name Lists Collected During the Survey by Lieutenants Conder and Kitchener, R. E. Transliterated and Explained by E.H. Palmer. Committee of the Palestine Exploration Fund.
- Pringle, D. (1993). The Churches of the Crusader Kingdom of Jerusalem: A-K (excluding Acre and Jerusalem). Vol. I. Cambridge University Press. ISBN 9780521390361.
- Pringle, D. (1997). Secular buildings in the Crusader Kingdom of Jerusalem: an archaeological Gazetter. Cambridge University Press. ISBN 0521 46010 7.
- Rey, E.G. (1883). Les colonies franques de Syrie aux XIIme et XIIIme siècles (in French). Paris: A. Picard.
- Robinson, E.; Smith, E. (1841). Biblical Researches in Palestine, Mount Sinai and Arabia Petraea: A Journal of Travels in the year 1838. Vol. 3. Boston: Crocker & Brewster.
- Röhricht, R. (1887). "Studien zur mittelalterlichen Geographie und Topographie Syriens". Zeitschrift des Deutschen Palästina-Vereins (in German). 10. Leipzig: K. Baedeker: 195–344.
- Röhricht, R. (1893). Regesta regni Hierosolymitani (MXCVII-MCCXCI) (in Latin). Berlin: Libraria Academica Wageriana.
- Zertal, A. (2004). The Manasseh Hill Country Survey. Vol. 1. Boston: BRILL. ISBN 9004137564.
- Zertal, A. (2016). The Manasseh Hill Country Survey. Vol. 3. Boston: BRILL. ISBN 978-9004312302.
