= Hazor =

Hazor or Hatzor (Hebrew: חצור) may refer to:

== Places ==
- Kingdoms of Hazor, mentioned in Jeremiah 49:28 and 49:30
- En-hazor, a fortified settlement named in the Book of Joshua
- Tel Hazor, an archaeological tel at the site of ancient Hazor in the southern Hula Valley
- Hazor HaGelilit, a town in northern Israel, just south of Tel Hazor
- Hatzor, a kibbutz in Be'er Tuvia Regional Council, Southern District, Israel
- Hatzor Airbase, an Israeli Air Force military air base near Hatzor
- Mount Hazor, a plateau on the boundary between Samaria and Judea
- Baal-hazor, the highest point on Mount Hazor, named in the Second Book of Samuel
- Nahal Hazor, a tributary to the Jordan River in the Dead Sea watershed

== Other ==
- "Hazor", a song on the 1998 album The Circle Maker (among several others) by John Zorn
- Hatzor Junction, the intersection of Highway 40 (Israel) and Route 3922 in Bnei Ayish
