= Al-Karmil =

Village in West Bank, Palestine

al-Karmil
- Municipality type D (Village council)

Arabic transcription(s)
  - Arabic: خربة الكرمل
  - Latin: Khirbat al-Karmil (official)
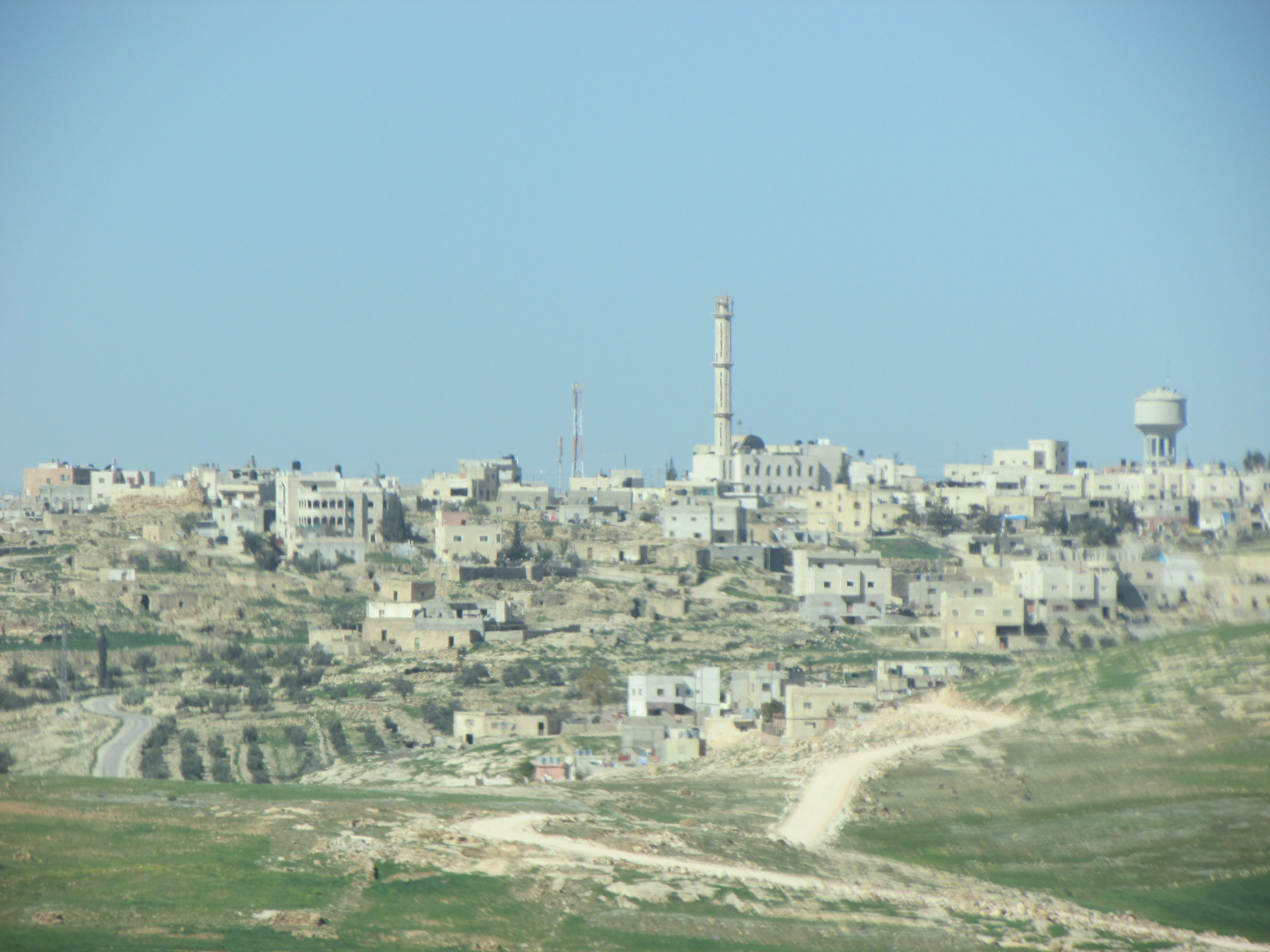
- Al-Karmil

- Location of al-Karmil within Palestine
- Coordinates: 31°25′25″N 35°07′59″E
- Palestine grid: 162/092
- State: State of Palestine
- Governorate: Hebron

Government
  - Type: Village council

Population (2017)
  - Total: 9,740

al-Karmil (Arabic: خربة الكرمل) is a Palestinian village located twelve kilometers south of Hebron. The village is in the Hebron Governorate Southern West Bank, within Area A under total Palestinian control. According to the Palestinian Central Bureau of Statistics, the village had a population of 9,740 in 2017. The primary health care facilities for the village are designated by the Ministry of Health as level 2.

== History ==
German biblical archaeologist, A. E. Mader (German article), who surveyed Palestine in 1911–1914, saw the strategic importance of historical Carmel in the fact that it's situated at the point where the main road crossing the hill country from north to south is splitting here, one road continuing towards Beersheba, and the other leading east to the southern end of the Dead Sea. The Survey of Western Palestine (SWP) authors, Conder & Kitchener, managed to trace an ancient road from Jerusalem to "El Kŭrmŭl" in 1874.

=== Hebrew Bible: Carmel in Judah ===
There are three references to al-Karmil in the Hebrew Bible. "Carmel" is mentioned as a city of Judah, the place where Saul erects a monument after the expedition against the Amalekites, and where Nabal the Carmelite resides (Joshua 15:55, 1 Samuel 15:12 and 1 Samuel 25).

=== Late Roman and Byzantine periods ===
Eusebius' Onomasticon mentions a garrison stationed here at the beginning of the fourth century. Towards the end of the fourth century, already during the Byzantine period, the Notitia Dignitatum document mentions an Illyrian cavalry unit in the town of Chermula. The large, perfectly preserved ancient water reservoir is noticed by all 19th-century explorers. It and a good spring provided the town with plenty of water. A relief showing Hercules was discovered just north of the reservoir during the Mandatory period.

Although placed on three low hills and therefore hard to defend, the town was sufficiently effective as a bullwark against Bedouin raids. Mader noticed that to Eusebius it is a χώμη 'Ιουδαίων, a 'Jewish village', but the presence of at least three churches, including a large one that was part of a monastery located south of the town, all from the following two centuries, are proof that the village had strikingly become preeminently Christian during the Byzantine period.

A total of three Byzantine churches were confirmed by archaeologists in recent years in the western part of ancient Carmel: a community church in the centre, and another two on hills to the north and south. Mader was witness to the villagers of Yatta using the ruins as a source for cut stones for their houses, in one case repurposing half of an inscribed lintel from a Byzantine church.

In 1984, Avraham Negev, starting from "still insufficient" archaeological evidence and a thorough reassessment of ancient written sources, proposed that Eusebius, by naming the village associated in his time with biblical Carmel in two different ways, Chermala and Karmelos, did not make one of his known mistakes, but reflected the existence of two associated settlements. Negev suggests that "old Carmel" (al-Karmil) was garrisoned by the Romans only after the Bar Kokhba Revolt (132–135), at which point most of its Jewish inhabitants gradually left during the years 150–300. They moved away to a site little over two kilometres away, now known as Khirbet Susiya, where –according to Jerome Murphy-O'Connor, who adopted Negev's theory– they never stopped identifying as "Carmel". When Eusebius compiled his Onomasticon, the migration process had just ended. "Old Carmel"/Chermala, modern day's Khirbet al-Karmil, therefore had a successively biblical (Jewish)–Roman (pagan)–Christian history. Negev interprets two different dedicatory inscriptions from the synagogue of "new Carmel"/Karmelos/Kh. Susiya as indicating that those Jews who had remained in "old Carmel" used to come for Sabbath and holidays to pray in "new Carmel", which lay within the Sabbath limit of the old village. "New Carmel" prospered tremendously based on its trade in wine and oil with the Romans (this including the Christian Byzantine period), but after the Muslim conquest of the Levant and the withdrawal of their main customers, lost their source of income, in part due to the Muslim prohibition of consuming alcohol. The Jewish population eventually left, the name Carmel of the newer site was forgotten and eventually replaced with the Arabic Khirbet Susiya, "Ruin of the Liquorice Plant", after a common species growing there.

Ceramics from the Byzantine era have been found here.

=== Crusader/Ayyubid period ===
"Carmel", today's Khirbat al-Karmil, was mentioned in Crusader sources in 1172/3, as the place King Amalric of Jerusalem assembled his army, next to a large ancient water reservoir. The Crusader's Carmel Castle was first mentioned in 1175 and was destroyed in 1187. In the 1920s, a Crusader tower built over the narthex of one of the Byzantine churches was seen with part of its first (upper) floor still standing, with arrow-slits on two sides; in the 1980s Pringle only found the barrel-vaulted basement with remains of the ground floor. French medievalist Paul Deschamps interpreted in the 1930s the role of the castle as built "to guard the road leading to Edom", i.e. to Oultrejordain. Emmanuel Guillaume-Rey, who visited Syria (including Palestine) between 1857 and 1864, saw a similarity between a type of medieval tower placed in France at strategic spots along mountain roads, and Crusader counterparts in Syria, and regarded the Carmel castle as a different variation to this theme.

Guillaume-Rey noticed the remains of a very large square structure with four round corner turrets, which he believed must have been a caravanserai, next to and therefore protected by the castle.

Le Strange quotes Yaqut al-Hamawi, who described "Kirmil" in the 1220s as "a village in the further limits of the Hebron territory, in the Province of Filastin.

=== 19th-century explorers ===
Several Western explorers visiting the site in 1938 (Edward Robinson), around 1860 (E. Guillaume-Rey), 1863 (Victor Guérin) and 1874 (Conder and Kitchener) are only describing extensive ancient ruins, including the remains of at least two churches; the large (117 x 74 ft) and "fine reservoir of masonry", connected by a rock-cut tunnel to a cave spring, which in October 1874 was filled with water; and the remains of the Crusader castle.

=== Jordanian period ===
During the Jordanian era (1948–1967), the census of 1961 found 146 inhabitants in al-Karmil.

=== 1967 and aftermath ===
In 1967, in a census conducted by Israel after it occupied the West Bank in the Six-Day War, the village was reported to have 76 residents in 17 households. Under the Oslo Accords, most of this town was assigned to Area A, with political control and security responsibilities assigned to the Palestinian National Authority.

The site contains an ancient reservoir, Birkat Al-Karmel, which has been transformed into a major recreation area, with a swimming pool. Gideon Levy writes:

The terraces, decorative landscaping, Hebron stones, washrooms and a spring that gushes from the rock next to the pool – all make this one of the most spectacular outdoor sites in the West Bank.

Twice, in 2015, settler tourists under IDF guard, made incursions into the park, after the army forced the local children out of the pool and allotted them to a corner while the settlers enjoyed the pool and the site.

== Demography and economy ==
Presently, al-Karmil is inhabited by several families originating from Yatta, who sustain themselves through sheep herding, dryland farming, and orchards. There are seven predominant families, including Abu 'Aram, Abu Tbakh, al-Dababsa, Haroush and Jabareen, among others. The Abu 'Aram family is part of the Makhamra clan.

== Bibliography ==
- Conder, C.R.; Kitchener, H.H. (1883). The Survey of Western Palestine: Memoirs of the Topography, Orography, Hydrography, and Archaeology. Vol. 3. London: Committee of the Palestine Exploration Fund.
- Dauphin, C. (1998). La Palestine Byzantine, Peuplement et Populations. BAR International Series 726 (in French). Vol. III : Catalogue. Oxford: Archeopress. ISBN 0-860549-05-4.
- Ellenblum, R. (2007). Crusader Castles and Modern Histories. Cambridge University Press. pp. 108, 254, 309. ISBN 978-0-521-86083-3.
- Government of Jordan, Department of Statistics (1964). First Census of Population and Housing. Volume I: Final Tables; General Characteristics of the Population (PDF).
- Guérin, V. (1869). Description Géographique Historique et Archéologique de la Palestine (in French). Vol. 1: Judee, pt. 3. Paris: L'Imprimerie Nationale.
- Guillaume-Rey, E. (1871). Étude sur les monuments de l'architecture militaire des croisés en Syrie et dans l'île de Chypre (in French). Paris: Imprimerie nationale.
- Le Strange, G. (1890). Palestine Under the Moslems: A Description of Syria and the Holy Land from A.D. 650 to 1500. Committee of the Palestine Exploration Fund. pp. 487-8.
- Mader, Andreas Evaristus (1918). Altchristliche Basiliken und Lokaltraditionen in Südjudäa. Archäologische und topographische Untersuchungen (in German). Paderborn: F. Schöningh.
- Palmer, E.H. (1881). The Survey of Western Palestine: Arabic and English Name Lists Collected During the Survey by Lieutenants Conder and Kitchener, R. E. Transliterated and Explained by E.H. Palmer. Committee of the Palestine Exploration Fund. (p. 403)
- Pringle, D. (1997). Secular buildings in the Crusader Kingdom of Jerusalem: an archaeological Gazetteer. Cambridge University Press. p. 61. ISBN 0521-46010-7.
- Robinson, E.; Smith, E. (1841). Biblical Researches in Palestine, Mount Sinai and Arabia Petraea: A Journal of Travels in the year 1838. Vol. 2. Boston: Crocker & Brewster.
