= Rantis =

- Municipality type D (Village council)

Arabic transcription(s)
  - Arabic: رنتيس
  - Latin: Rantes (official)
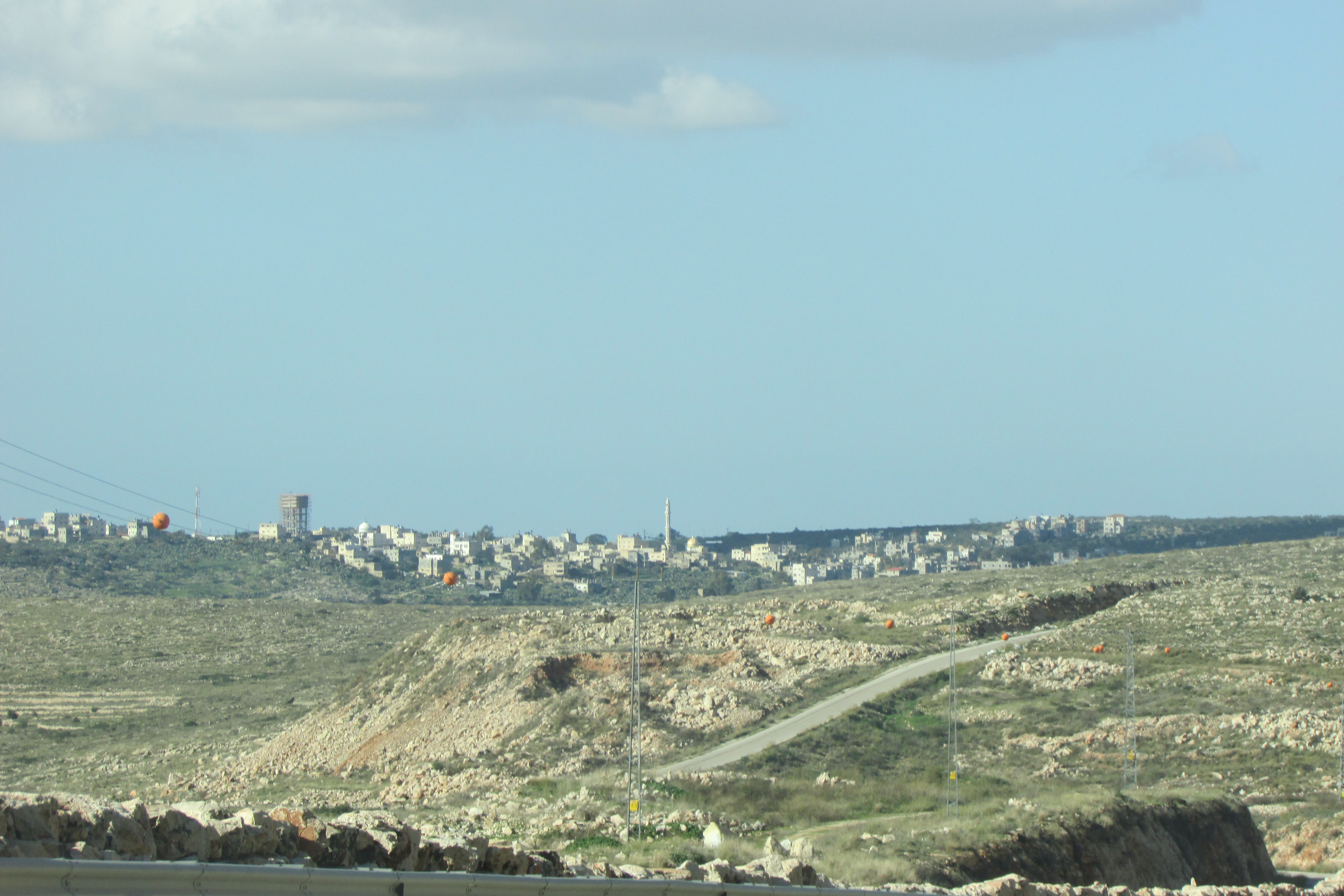
- Rantis

- Location of Rantis within Palestine
- Coordinates: 32°01′41″N 35°01′10″E
- Palestine grid: 151/159
- State: State of Palestine
- Governorate: Ramallah and al-Bireh

Government
  - Type: Village council

Area
  - Total: 11.0 km^{2} (4.2 sq mi)

Population (2017)
  - Total: 3,179
  - Density: 289/km^{2} (749/sq mi)
- Name meaning: Rentis, personal name
- Time zone: UTC+03:00

Rantis (Arabic: رنتيس) is a Palestinian town in the West Bank, located in the northwestern Ramallah and al-Bireh Governorate, 33 kilometers northwest of Ramallah. According to the Palestinian Central Bureau of Statistics, it had a population of 3,179 in 2017. Its population consists primarily of six clans: Danoun, Wahdan, Khallaf, Ballot, Dar Abo Salim, al-Ryahee and Hawashe.

Rantis has a land area 11,046 dunams of which 589 dunams are built-up area. The town's main economic sector is agriculture and 20% of its land area is planted with crops. There are two primary schools and two kindergartens. Other facilities include three clinics, a bus station, a club and two mosques.

== Location ==
Rantis is located 22.2 km northwest of Ramallah. It is bordered by Al Lubban al Gharbi and Abud land to the east, Al Lubban al Gharbi village land to the north, Israel to the west and Shuqba to the south.

== Connection to Arimathea of the Gospels ==
All the four Gospels mention Joseph of Arimathea, the man who placed Christ's body in his own tomb. Conflicting traditions urge Arimathea's location at modern Rantis, 15 miles east of Jaffa. A monastery dedicated to Joseph of Arimathea was erected there. Other suggestions for Arimathea include ar-Ram and al-Bireh-Ramallah, 5 and 8 miles north of Jerusalem, respectively.

Both Eusebius and Jerome identify Arimathea with the birthplace of biblical prophet Samuel. Strong mediaeval traditions supporting this claim celebrated this place as the prophet's original home. In the 4th century, Jerome reported that his friend, Saint Paula, visited the location.

== History ==
=== Prehistory ===
In a nearby cave, flint artefacts have been found, possibly produced during the Middle Paleolithic period, occasionally by the Levallois technique.

=== Iron Age to Byzantine period ===
The Survey of Western Palestine assumed the village was "ancient", as rock-cut tombs were found south-west of the village.

Archaeological excavation have uncovered sherds from the Iron Age and Persian period.

In 145 BCE, Rentis, then known as Rathamin, was cut off from Samaria and incorporated into Judaea. It served as a toparchy's headquarters before Thamna took its position.

Other archaeological finds include remains of a road and a building from the Roman period. A building, probably dating to the Byzantine period, has also been excavated.

=== Crusader period ===
During the Crusader period, it was known as Arimathia, Arimatie, Abarimatie, and Rantis. By 1150, the Premonstratensians were represented in Rentis with a house. In 1159–60, Crusader sources mention a church in the village.

In 1187 Rantis was conquered by Saladin, and the Crusaders were never able to return despite the very fact that Amalric of Jerusalem used to rule the area before being succeeded to Sidon at around 1153.

=== Ottoman period ===
==== 16th century ====
Rantis was incorporated into the Ottoman Empire in 1517 with all of Palestine, and in 1596 it appeared in the tax registers as being in the Nahiya of Jabal Qubal of the Liwa of Nablus. It had a population of 20 households and 2 bachelors, all Muslim. The villagers paid a fixed tax-rate of 33.3% on agricultural products, including wheat, barley, summer crops, olive trees, goats and/or beehives, and a wine- or olive press; a total of 2,500 Akçe.

==== 19th century ====
In 1838, Edward Robinson noted it as a village, Rentis, in the Jurat Merda district, south of Nablus.

The French explorer Victor Guérin visited the village in 1870, and found that it had 400 inhabitants, and that it was surrounded by olives and tobacco-plantations.

In 1870/71 (1288 AH), an Ottoman census listed the village in the nahiya (sub-district) of Jamma'in al-Awwal, subordinate to Nablus.

In 1882, the PEF's Survey of Western Palestine (SWP) described Rantis as a village, principally made of adobe, on a slope, surrounded by open ground and a few olive trees. Water was supplied by cisterns. The SWP assumed the village was "ancient", as rock-cut tombs were found there.

=== British Mandate ===
In the 1922 census of Palestine conducted by the British Mandate authorities, Rantis had a population of 824 inhabitants, all Muslims, increasing in the 1931 census to 954, still all Muslims, in a total of 213 houses.

In the 1945 statistics, the population was of 1,280, all Muslims, while the total land area was 30,933 dunams, according to an official land and population survey. Of this, 1,299 were allocated for plantations and irrigable land, 7,341 for cereals, while 30 dunams were classified as built-up (urban) areas.

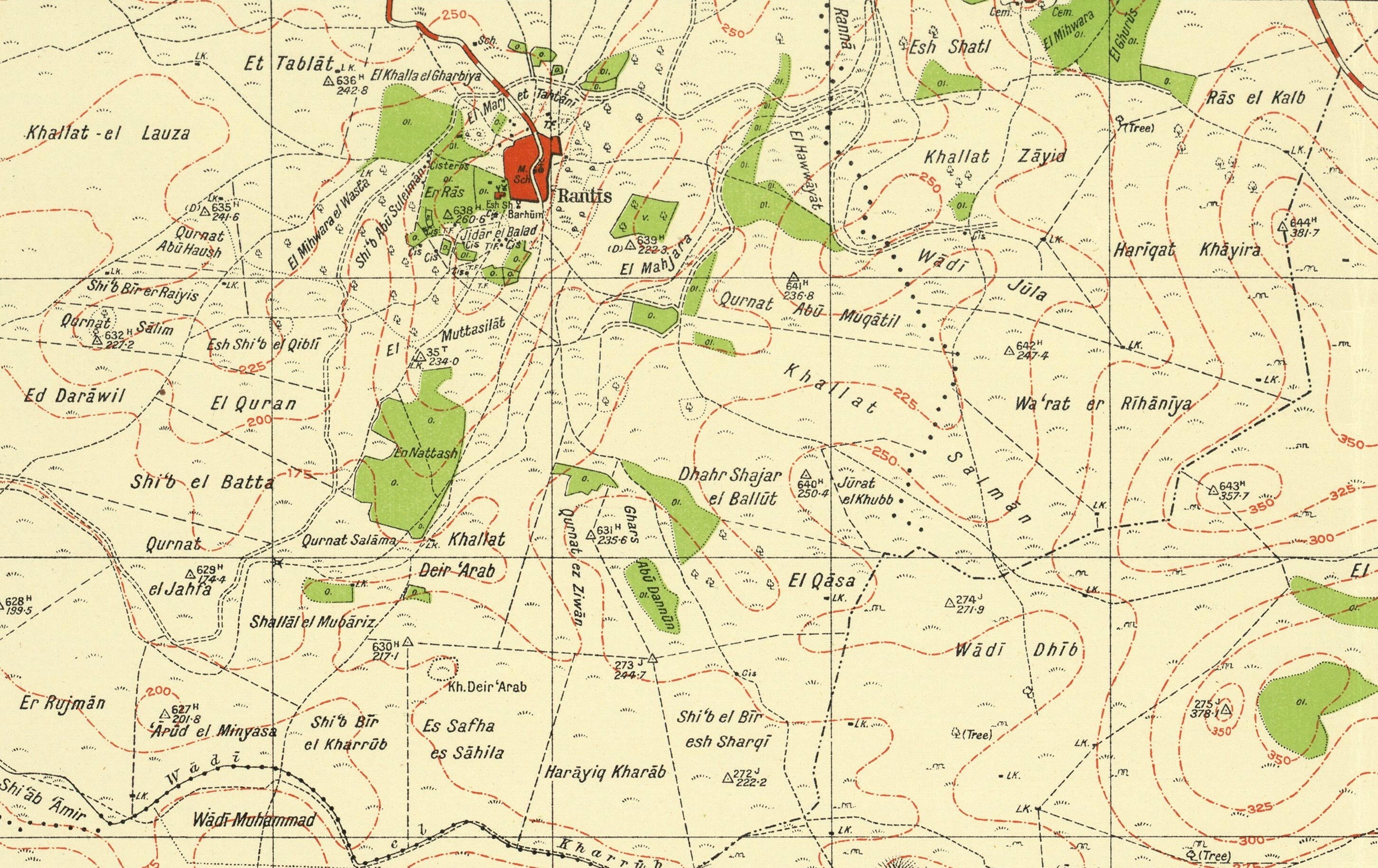
Rantis 1944 1:20,000

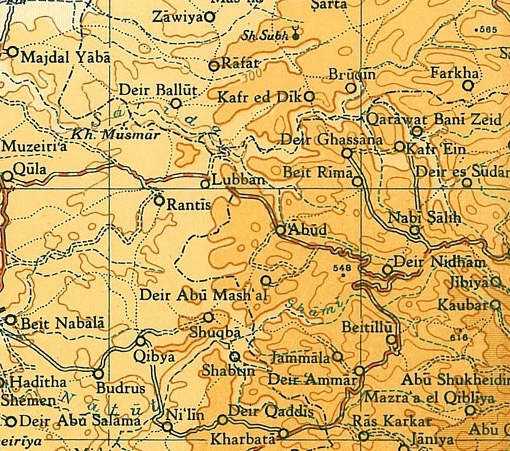
Rantis 1945 1:250,000

=== Jordanian period (1948-1967) ===
In the wake of the 1948 Arab–Israeli War, and after the 1949 Armistice Agreements, Rantis came under Jordanian rule.

==== 1953 Israeli raid ====
A report by Major General Vagn Bennike, Chief of Staff of the United Nations Truce Supervision Organization, to the United Nations Security Council read:

On 28–29 January 1953 Israeli military forces estimated at 120 to 150 men, using 2-inch mortars, 3-inch mortars, P.I.A.T. (projectors, infantry, anti-tank) weapons, bangalore torpedoes (long metal tubes containing an explosive charge), machine-guns, grenades and small arms, crossed the demarcation line and attacked the Arab villages of Falameh [Falāma, Falamya] and Rantis. At Falameh the mukhtar was killed, seven other villagers were wounded, and three houses were demolished. The attack lasted four and a half hours. Israel was condemned for this act by the Mixed Armistice Commission.

==== 1961 population numbers ====
In 1961, the population of Rantis was 1,539.

=== Post-1967 ===
After the Six-Day War in 1967, Rantis has been under Israeli occupation. The population in the 1967 census conducted by the Israeli authorities was 897, 27 of whom originated from Israeli territory.

After the 1995 accords, about 12% of the village land was classified as Area B, while the remainder 88% was classified as Area C. According to ARIJ, Israel has confiscated village land to be used for bypass roads for Israeli settlements. The Israeli West Bank barrier will extend for 4 km on Rantis village land, and leave 1,815 dunams (16.6%) of the village land behind the barrier.

== Bibliography ==
- Barron, J.B., ed. (1923). Palestine: Report and General Abstracts of the Census of 1922. Government of Palestine.
- Conder, C.R.; Kitchener, H.H. (1882). The Survey of Western Palestine: Memoirs of the Topography, Orography, Hydrography, and Archaeology. Vol. 2. London: Committee of the Palestine Exploration Fund.
- Dauphin, C. (1998). La Palestine byzantine, Peuplement et Populations. BAR International Series 726 (in French). Vol. III : Catalogue. Oxford: Archeopress. ISBN 0-860549-05-4.
- Elisha, Yossi (2011-09-26). "Rantis (Northwest)". Hadashot Arkheologiyot – Excavations and Surveys in Israel (123).
- Elisha, Yossi (2013-12-08). "Rantis, Spot Height 211". Hadashot Arkheologiyot – Excavations and Surveys in Israel (125).
- Finkelstein, I.; Lederman, Zvi, eds. (1997). Highlands of many cultures. Tel Aviv: Institute of Archaeology of Tel Aviv University Publications Section. ISBN 965-440-007-3. (pp. 179–181)
- Government of Jordan, Department of Statistics (1964). First Census of Population and Housing. Volume I: Final Tables; General Characteristics of the Population (PDF).
- Government of Palestine, Department of Statistics (1945). Village Statistics, April, 1945.
- Guérin, V. (1875). Description Géographique Historique et Archéologique de la Palestine (in French). Vol. 2: Samarie, pt. 2. Paris: L'Imprimerie Nationale.
- Hadawi, S. (1970). Village Statistics of 1945: A Classification of Land and Area ownership in Palestine. Palestine Liberation Organization Research Center.
- Hütteroth, W.-D.; Abdulfattah, K. (1977). Historical Geography of Palestine, Transjordan and Southern Syria in the Late 16th Century. Erlanger Geographische Arbeiten, Sonderband 5. Erlangen, Germany: Vorstand der Fränkischen Geographischen Gesellschaft. ISBN 3-920405-41-2.
- Lupu, Ronit; et al. (2009-07-29). "Rantis Cave". Hadashot Arkheologiyot – Excavations and Surveys in Israel (121).
- Mills, E., ed. (1932). Census of Palestine 1931. Population of Villages, Towns and Administrative Areas. Jerusalem: Government of Palestine.
- Palmer, E.H. (1881). The Survey of Western Palestine: Arabic and English Name Lists Collected During the Survey by Lieutenants Conder and Kitchener, R. E. Transliterated and Explained by E.H. Palmer. Committee of the Palestine Exploration Fund.
- Pringle, D. (1998). The Churches of the Crusader Kingdom of Jerusalem: L-Z (excluding Tyre). Vol. II. Cambridge University Press. ISBN 0-521-39037-0.
- Rey, E.G. (1883). Les colonies franques de Syrie aux XIIme et XIIIme siècles (in French). Paris: A. Picard. (p. 414)
- Robinson, E.; Smith, E. (1841). Biblical Researches in Palestine, Mount Sinai and Arabia Petraea: A Journal of Travels in the year 1838. Vol. 3. Boston: Crocker & Brewster.
- de Rozière, ed. (1849). Cartulaire de l'église du Saint Sépulchre de Jérusalem: publié d'après les manuscrits du Vatican (in Latin and French). Paris: Imprimerie nationale.
- Röhricht, R. (1893). (RRH) Regesta regni Hierosolymitani (MXCVII-MCCXCI) (in Latin). Berlin: Libraria Academica Wageriana.
