= Aboud =

Palestinian village in Ramallah and al-Bireh, State of Palestine

- Municipality type D (Village council)

Arabic transcription(s)
  - Arabic: عابود
  - Latin: 'Abud (official); Abboud (unofficial)
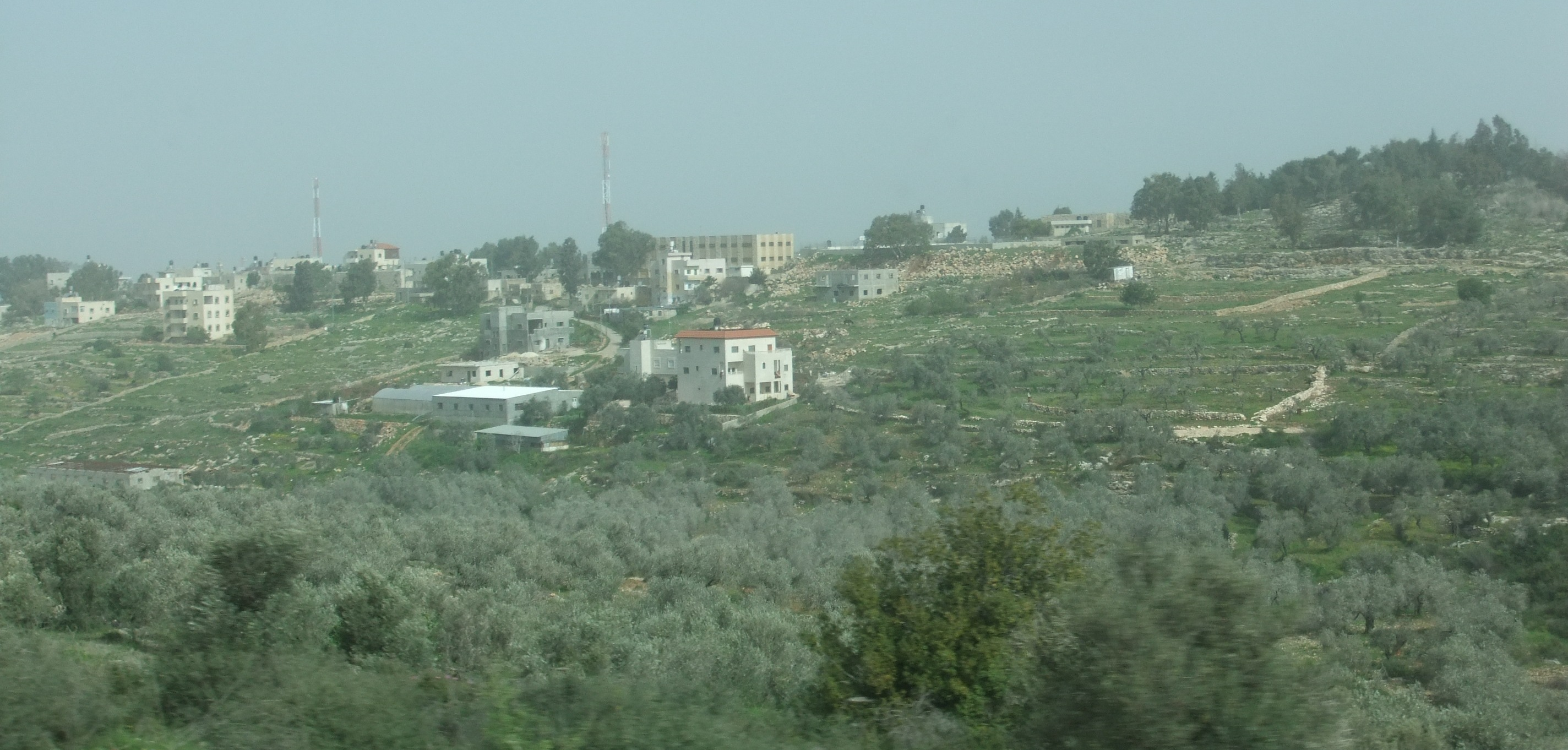
- Aboud from the south

- Location of Aboud within Palestine
- Coordinates: 32°00′54″N 35°04′05″E
- Palestine grid: 156/158
- State: State of Palestine
- Governorate: Ramallah and al-Bireh

Government
  - Type: Village council
  - Head of Municipality: Elias Azar

Area
  - Total: 15.0 km^{2} (5.8 sq mi)

Population (2017)
  - Total: 2,153
  - Density: 144/km^{2} (372/sq mi)
- Name meaning: Abud, personal name, from "to worship"

Aboud (Arabic: عابود, romanized: ʿĀbūd) is a Palestinian village in the Ramallah and al-Bireh Governorate of the State of Palestine, in the central West Bank, northwest of Ramallah and 30 kilometers north of Jerusalem. Nearby towns include al-Lubban to the northeast and Bani Zeid to the northwest.

Aboud is believed to be the site of a Jewish settlement before the Bar Kokhba revolt. During the Byzantine period, Aboud likely housed a significant Christian community, with the early architectural elements of St. Mary Church indicating construction from that era. Despite Arabization during the early Muslim period, the community retained the Aramaic language for ceremonial and liturgical purposes. During the Crusades, Aboud was known as Casale Santa Maria, primarily inhabited by local Orthodox Christians with a minority of Crusader settlers. Ottoman records indicate a predominant Syrian Christian majority in the sixteenth century, a status that endured into the nineteenth century.

According to the 2017 census conducted by the Palestinian Central Bureau of Statistics, the village had a population of 2,153. The majority of the village's citizens are Christians, most of whom are Greek Orthodox. Near the village are numerous natural springs, which are sources for the Yarkon River.

== Location ==
Abud is located 17.7 km northwest of Ramallah. It is bordered by Deir Nidham to the east, Bani Zeid to the north, Rantis and al Lubban el Gharbi to the west, and Deir Abu Mash'al to the south.

== History ==
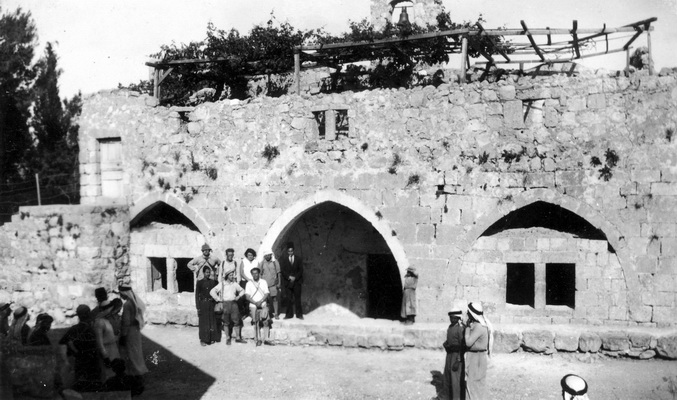
Church of St Mary (Sitti Miriam) in 1932

Sherds from the Iron Age II, Byzantine, Crusader/Ayyubid and Mamluk eras have been found here. There is archeological evidence that the village was inhabited during the Roman, Byzantine, Crusader, Ayyubid, Mamluk and Ottoman eras.

=== Roman period ===
Based on the findings in the nearby 'Abud Cave and in the adjacent necropolis of Mokata 'Abud, archaeologists believe 'Aboud was the site of a Jewish settlement during the late Second Temple period and up until the Bar Kokhba revolt. Although construction from later periods has covered the ancient settlement's remains, the magnificence of the ancient burial caves indicates the splendor of the ancient settlement.

=== Byzantine period ===
During the Byzantine era, Aboud seems to have had a prominent Christian community. The earliest architectural parts of the St. Mary Church in Aboud indicate a fifth- to sixth-century construction date.

=== Early Muslim period ===
Although it appears that the community in 'Abud underwent a process of Arabization during the early Muslim period, they were still able to preserve the Christian Palestinian Aramaic language and tradition long into this period and beyond it. However, they no longer used it as a spoken language; instead, they used this dialect for ceremonial events and liturgical uses. A Palestinian Syriac inscription in the St. Mary Church indicate that it was active 1058, during Fatimid rule.

=== Crusader/Mamluk era ===
In 1099, Aboud and much of Syria was conquered by European Crusaders. During the Crusader period, Aboud was known by them as the Latin Casale Santa Maria. At the time, it was an unfortified agricultural village inhabited mostly by local Orthodox Christians. A minority of the population consisted of Crusader settlers. The Crusaders made improvements and additions to the church, such as the nave and the north aisle.

In 1104, Mufarij ibn Abu al-Hayr al-Abudi, a monk from Aboud, copied Syriac manuscripts in the Saint Catherine's Monastery in Sinai. In 1167, Casale Santa Maria was sold by King Baldwin IV to the Knights Hospitallers. Starting in 1176, they used revenues from the village to supply white bread to the sick in the hospital of Jerusalem.

In 1225, Yaqut al-Hamawi noted Aboud was a "small town in Filastin Province, near Jerusalem. The name is Hebrew, and [has] become Arabicized." At another point in the 13th century, an Aboud monk, Sarur ibn Abd al-Masih al-Abudi, was recorded as copying Syriac manuscripts in Cairo. The southern part of Aboud was founded in the 13th or 14th century, during Mamluk rule. Two ornate mausoleums in this part of Aboud were built during the Mamluk period. Arab historian al-Maqrizi mentioned these in the 14th century.

=== Ottoman era ===
Aboud as part of Palestine was incorporated into the Ottoman Empire. In the 1553–57 tax records, Aboud had a population of 35 families; 19 of whom were Christian and 16 Muslim. In the 1596 Ottoman tax records, it was classified as part of the nahiya ("sub-district") of Ramla, part of the Sanjak of Gaza. Its population remained the same, with 19 Christian households and 16 Muslim households, and the inhabitants paid a fixed tax rate of 25% on wheat, barley, and other produce; a total of 21,000 akçe. All of the revenue went to a waqf. It was later designated as a part of the Bani Zeid administrative region, still under the Ottomans.

In 1870 the French explorer Victor Guérin found that Aboud contained 800 inhabitants, half Greek Orthodox and half Muslims, while an Ottoman village list of about the same year showed that Aboud had 225 Muslims with 69 houses, and 170 Greek Orthodox with 66 houses, though the population count included men only.

In 1882, the PEF's Survey of Western Palestine described the village as "a large and flourishing Christian village, of stone, the houses nearly all marked with the Cross in red paint," with a population of 400 Orthodox Christians and 100 Muslims.

In 1896 the population of Abud was estimated to be about 303 Muslims and 366 Christians.

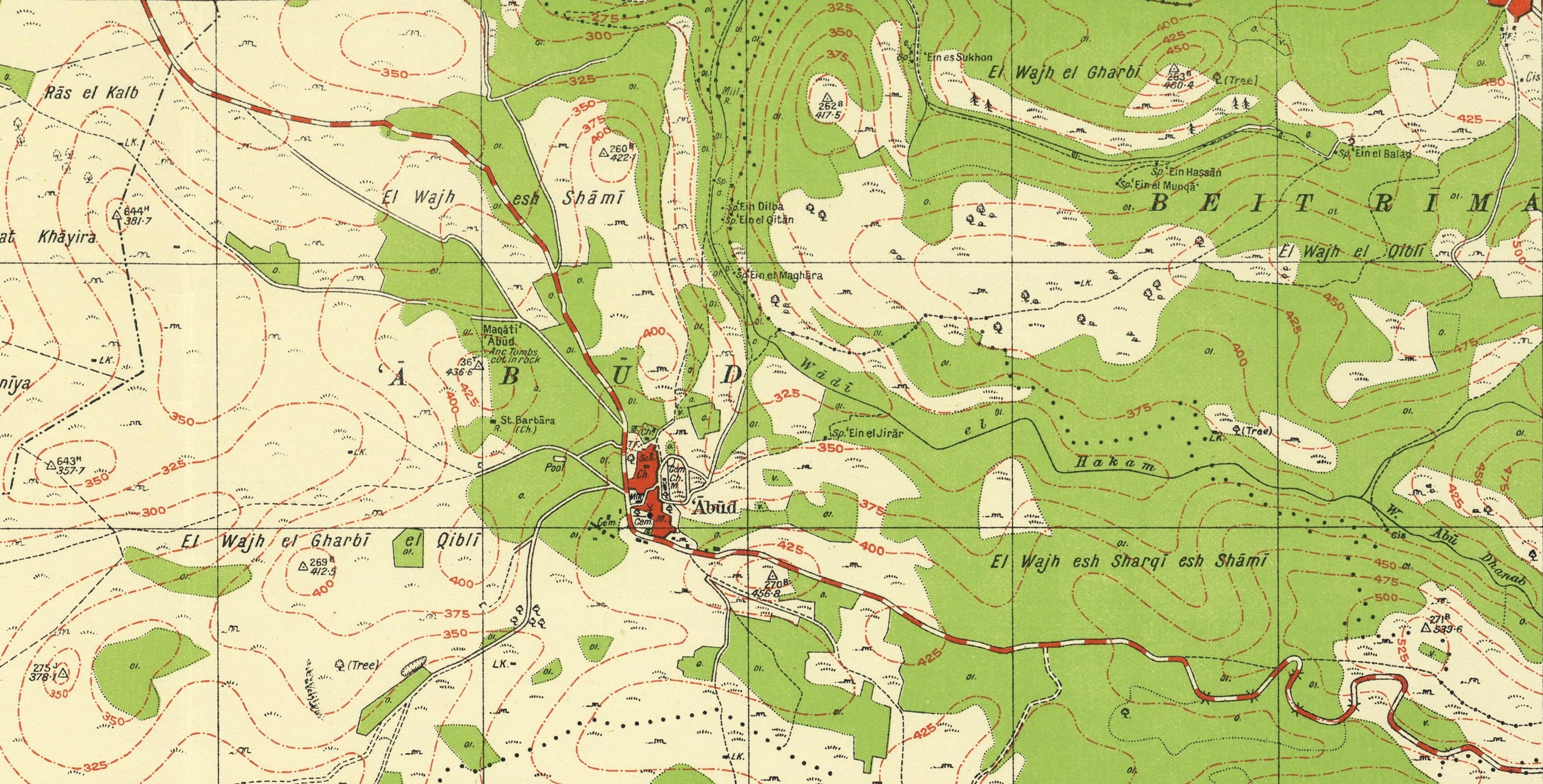
Aboud ('Abud) 1944 1:20,000

=== British Mandate era ===
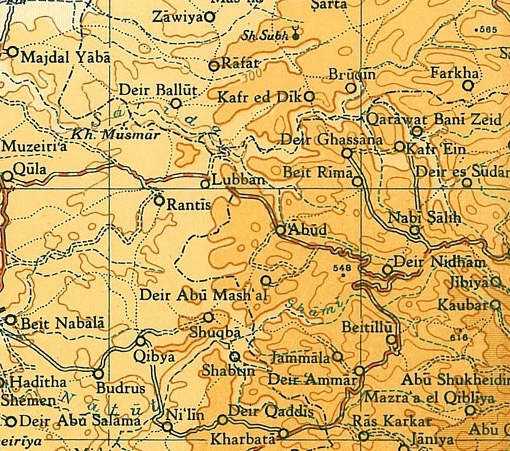
Aboud ('Abud) 1945 1:250,000

In the 1922 census of Palestine conducted by the British Mandate authorities, Aboud had a population of 754; 352 Muslim and 402 Christians. The latter included 335 Orthodox, 41 Roman Catholics, and 26 who belonged to the Church of England. At the time of the 1931 census, the population had increased to 910; 470 Christians and 440 Muslims, in 215 houses. The Christians largely inhabited the older, northern part of Aboud, while the Muslims inhabited the relatively newer, southern part.

In the 1945 statistics, the population was 1,080; 550 Muslims and 530 Christians. The total land area was 15,007 dunams, according to an official land and population survey. Of this, 4,843 dunams were allocated for plantations and irrigable land, and 1,905 for cereals, while 55 dunams were classified as built-up (urban) areas.

=== Jordanian era ===
In the wake of the 1948 Arab–Israeli War, and after the 1949 Armistice Agreements, Aboud came under Jordanian rule. It was annexed by Jordan in 1950.

The Jordanian census of 1961 found 1,521 inhabitants, of whom 716 were Christians.

=== 1967–present ===
Since the Six-Day War in 1967, Aboud has been under Israeli occupation. After Oslo II in 1995, 16.8% of village land was classified as Area B, and the remaining 83.2% as Area C. Israel has confiscated land from Aboud in order to construct the Israeli settlements of Beit Aryeh-Ofarim. In late July 2018, Israeli authorities informed village elders that they intended seizing a further 324 dunums (80 acres) of land shared by both Aboud and Al-Lubban al-Gharbi on grounds that the land was needed in order to construct an Israeli-only road between the settlements of Beit Arye and Ofarim.

== Church of St Mary (Sitti Miriam) ==
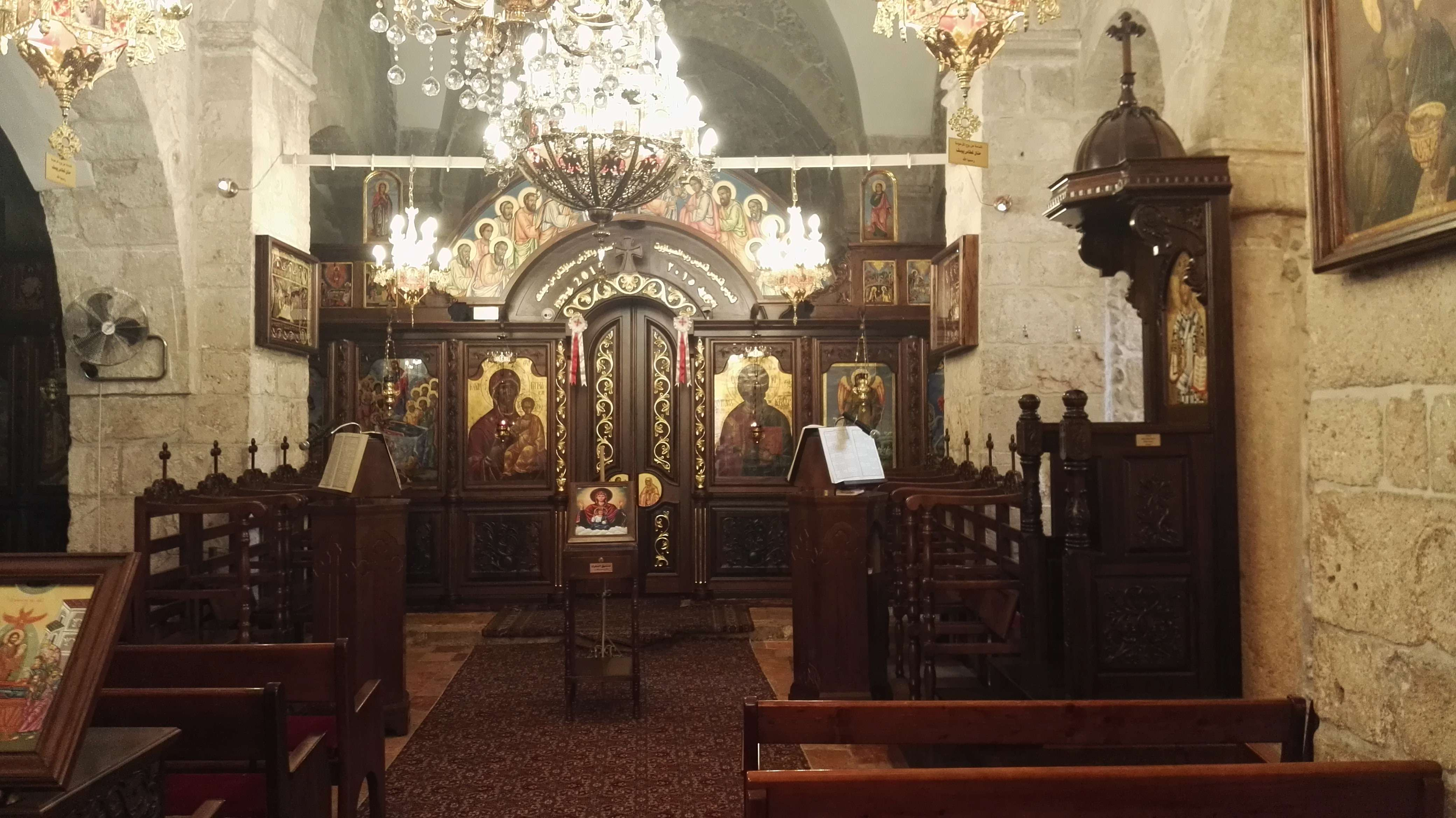
Interior of Church of St Mary, in 2017

Al-Abudiyah Church, also known as Saint Mary's Church, is situated in the center of Aboud. The earliest remains, including two capitals and the semi-circular arches they support, suggests a fifth- to sixth-century construction date. It was long believed to have been founded during the Crusader period in Palestine, when it was known as Casale Santa Maria. But, an Aramaic inscription on a vault in the church, found during late 20th century restoration work, indicates that it was founded before the arrival of Crusaders, but fell into disrepair. According to the inscription, the church was rebuilt in 1058 CE during the Fatimid era. In the 18th century an additional wall, as well as several windows and doors were constructed.

Restorations and conservation were conducted in 1997. This uncovered remains of a Byzantine church with mosaic floors. The cement plaster in the vaulting of the church was replaced with traditional mortar, stones inside the church were cleaned, the atrium was repaved, and a reinforcing northern wall was constructed.

In 2013 Christians from the United Kingdom worked on a project with the church choir of St. Mary's Church to record "The Mary Prayers" as a fundraising initiative. Proceeds from the sales of the CD or downloads are directed to humanitarian projects for the Muslims and Christians in Aboud.

== Demographics ==
According to the Palestinian Central Bureau of Statistics, the village had a population of approximately 2,084 inhabitants in 2007. It has a mixed population of Muslims and Christians, mostly Eastern Orthodox. It has ancient churches built during the Byzantine period of the 6th to 8th centuries.

== Economy ==
Historically, Aboud's economy was centered on agriculture, specifically olives. Their cultivation in the 21st century takes up 43% of village lands. In total, 57% of Aboud's lands are cultivable; other crops are figs, apples, grapes, and almonds. Its primary agricultural products are olive oil, olive-based soap, dried figs, and almonds. In 2005 agriculture employed 19% of the village's labor force. The remaining 81% work in the governmental and private sectors, construction, and animal husbandry.

Following the Second Intifada, which began in 2000, the residents who worked in Israel (10% of Aboud's labor force) lost their jobs there.

== Archaeology ==
=== 'Abud Cave ===
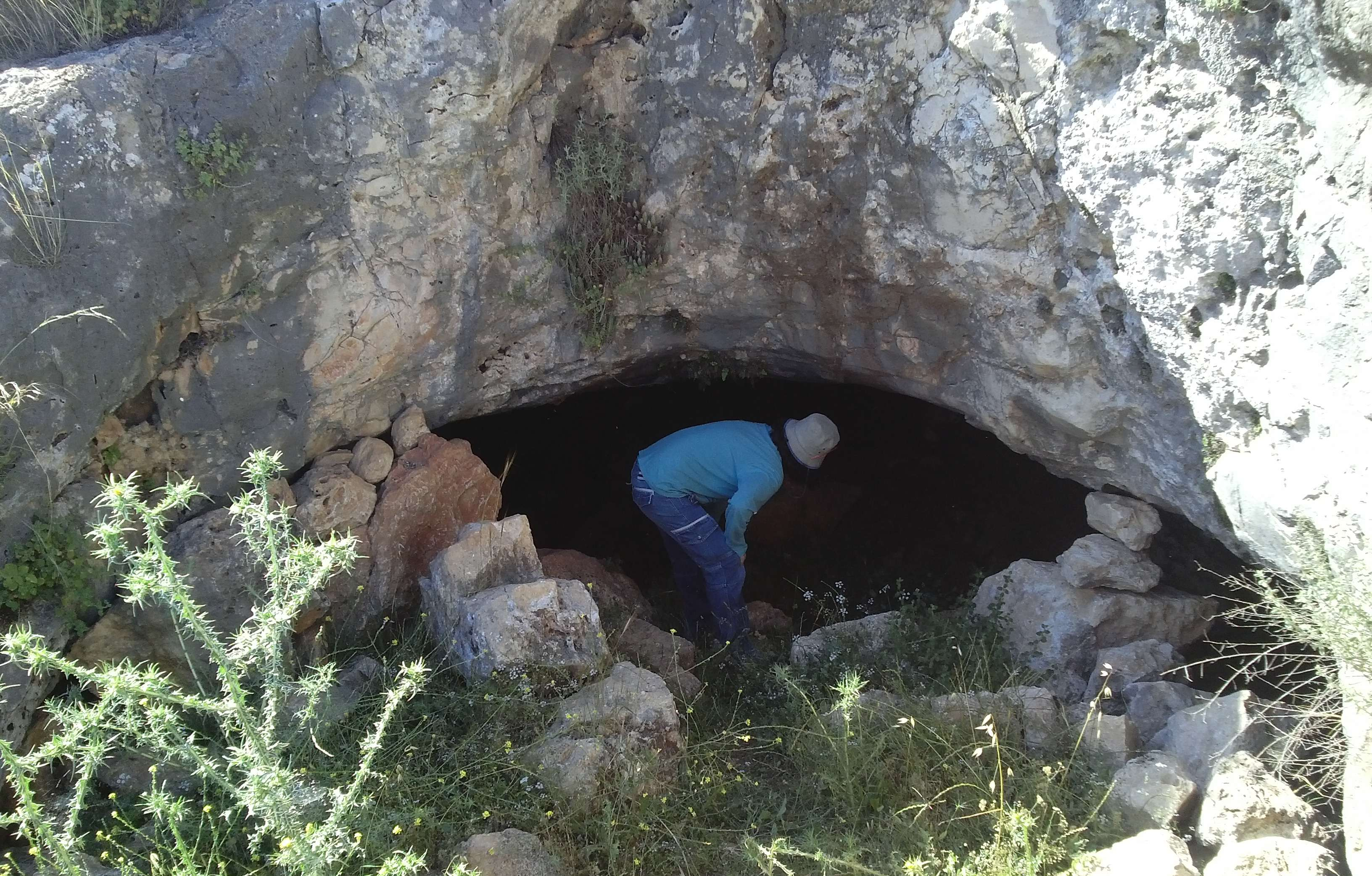
'Abud Cave

The 'Abud cave, a large karst cave in the vicinity of the village, is also a significant archeological site. Artifacts from the Chalcolithic, Middle Bronze, and Iron Ages, as well as the Roman, Byzantine, and early Arab periods, have been discovered in it. During the Bar Kokhba revolt, it served as a refuge cave for Jewish refugees who left there numerous objects, including oil lamps, glass and metal artifacts, and coins typical of the period.

Based on the findings from the cave along with the nearby Mokata 'Abud tombs, archaeologists believe that 'Aboud was a Jewish village during the early Roman period. The settlement may have suffered damage during the Jewish–Roman wars, forcing the locals to flee for their lives and abandon their homes. The evidence from the cave suggests that during the Bar Kokhba revolt, tens, possibly even hundreds, of the villagers temporarily took refuge inside. The absence of human remains may suggest that those who sought refuge there managed to escape unhurt, but it could also be a hint of antiquities' robbery, later activity in the cave (such as the return of Jews to bury their brethren), or the archeological's survey's limitations.

=== Mokata 'Abud ===
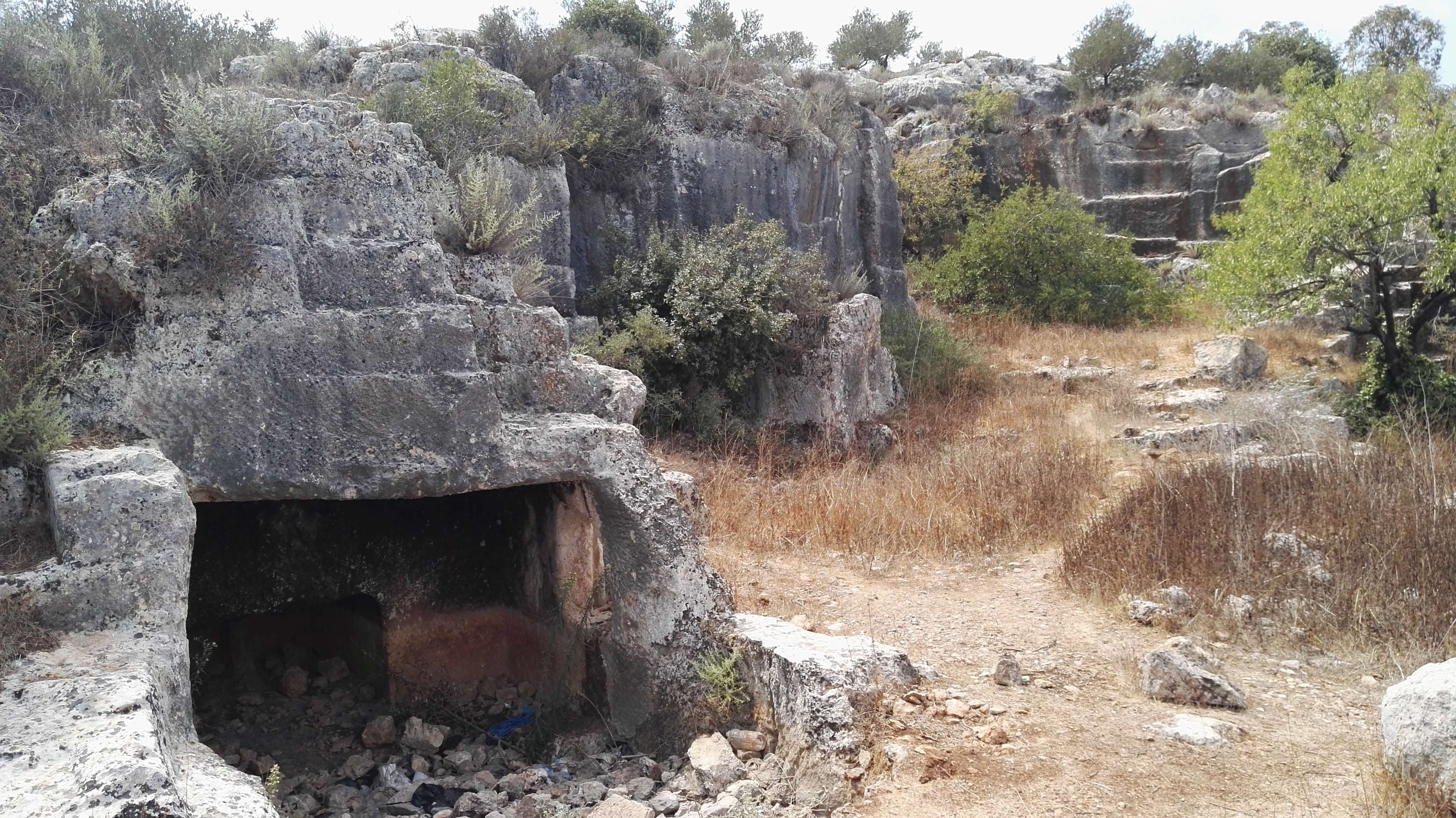
Mokata 'Abud, a necropolis of the early Roman period

Mokata 'Abud, an archeological site located on the northwestern outskirts of the village, contains a necropolis believed to date back to the first century CE. The necropolis features a two-chamber tomb with loculi along with an elaborate portico adorned with wreaths, rosettes, and grapes, similar to those found in Jerusalem and in other locations in West Samaria. Peleg-Barkat conclude that Mokata 'Abud and other similar tombs in Samaria were built by local Jewish elites inspired by the elaborate tombs of the Jewish elite of Jerusalem. While Magen has linked them to the exodus of Jewish craftsmen from Jerusalem to Samaria before the siege of Jerusalem in 70 CE.

SWP visited in 1866, and made extensive notes about 9 tombs here.

=== Byzantine and Crusader Churches ===
==== Barbara ====
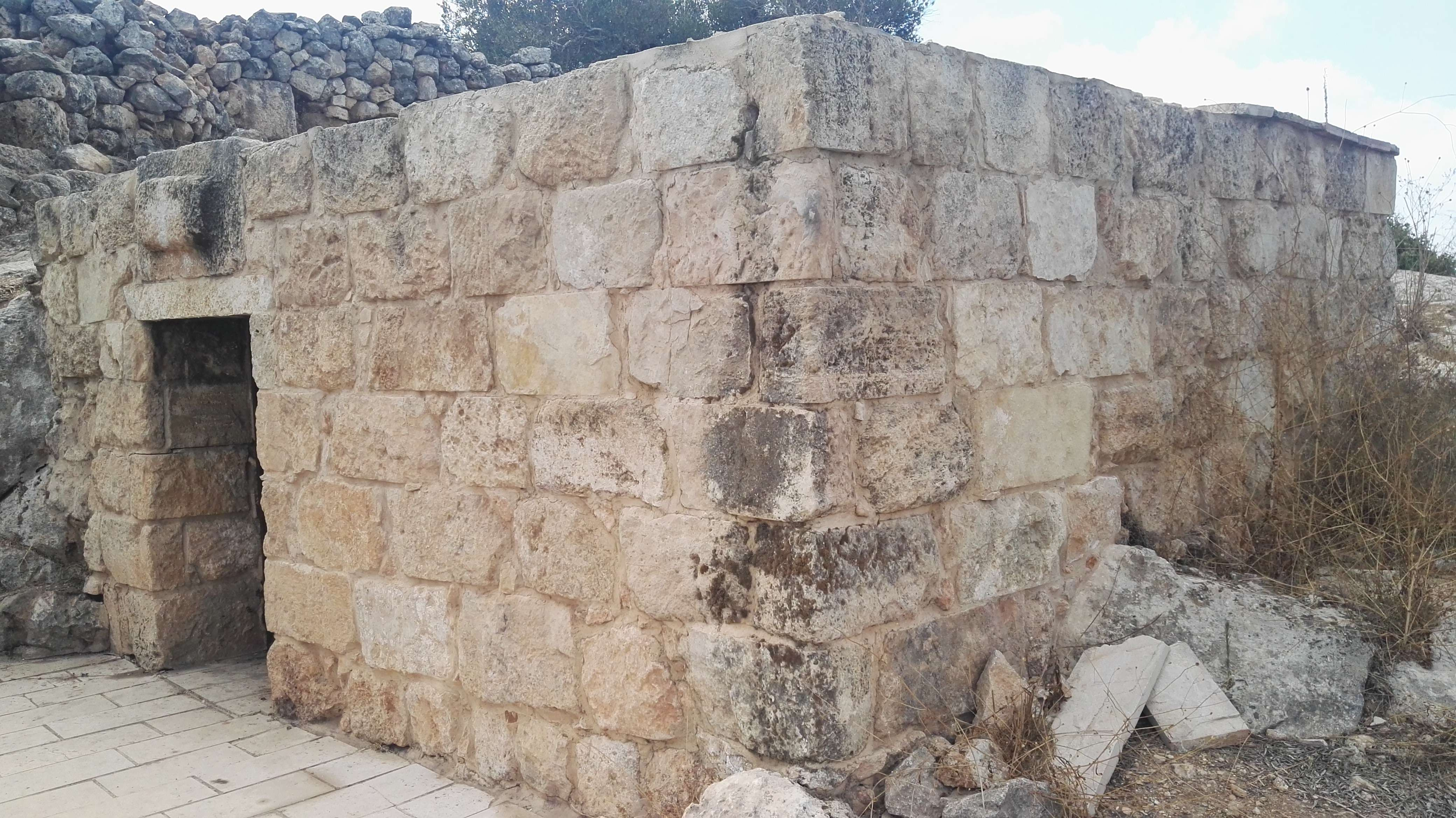
Near the ruined St Barbara church, 2017

Adjacent to Aboud is an ancient monastery named after Saint Barbara. Located on a hill due west of the village, the Church of Saint Barbara was erected in the Byzantine period. Archaeologists trace its history to the 6th century CE. Ancient catacombs have been uncovered by the church; their dating is uncertain. One of the burial caves is especially grandiose, with a door post decorated with carvings of wreaths, grape vines and grape clusters standing at its entrance.

On 5 June 1873, SWP visited and made a description: "A small ruined chapel; still a place of pilgrimage for Christians. It is of good masonry, the foundations only remaining, measuring about 10 feet across inside, and 22 feet in length east and west. Between the chapel and the village of 'Abud is a fine pool lined with masonry, which was full when visited."

Locals consider Saint Barbara to have been the oldest and most sacred of Aboud's churches. Palestinian Christians visited the church annually on 17 December to celebrate the St. Barbara's Day festival. On 31 May 2002, the Israeli army blew up and destroyed the church. The Israeli military claimed that they were unaware of the church's significance and demolished it by mistake.

==== Monastery of St Elias (Mar Elia) ====
Under Fatimid rule, in 1030, a Christian monk named Elias from Aboud copied Syriac manuscripts in Antioch. He later returned to Aboud and founded the Deir al-Kaukab monastery, also called Monastery of St Elias (Mar Elia), near the village. The site of Mar Elia has been identified 1.5 km south-east of the village, and it is assumed that monastery excised into the twelfth century.

==== Others ====
Additional local churches include one dedicated to St. Theodore (located in the center of the village) and to St. Anastasia (to the south of the village). Both are from the 7th–8th centuries.

== Bibliography ==
- Barron, J.B., ed. (1923). Palestine: Report and General Abstracts of the Census of 1922. Government of Palestine.
- Clermont-Ganneau, C.S. (1898). Recueil d'archéologie orientale (in French). Vol. 2. Paris. (p. 166 ff)
- Conder, C.R.; Kitchener, H.H. (1882). The Survey of Western Palestine: Memoirs of the Topography, Orography, Hydrography, and Archaeology. Vol. 2. London: Committee of the Palestine Exploration Fund. (pp. 302–03, 305, 347)
- Conder, C.R. (1873). "Lieut. Claude R. Conder's report". Quarterly Statement - Palestine Exploration Fund. 5.
- Dauphin, C. (1998). La Palestine byzantine, Peuplement et Populations. BAR International Series 726 (in French). Vol. III : Catalogue. Oxford: Archeopress. ISBN 0-860549-05-4.
- Ellenblum, R. (2003). Frankish Rural Settlement in the Latin Kingdom of Jerusalem. Cambridge University Press. ISBN 9780521521871.
- Finkelstein, I.; Lederman, Zvi, eds. (1997). Highlands of many cultures. Tel Aviv: Institute of Archaeology of Tel Aviv University Publications Section. ISBN 965-440-007-3.
- Government of Jordan, Department of Statistics (1964). First Census of Population and Housing. Volume I: Final Tables; General Characteristics of the Population (PDF).
- Government of Palestine, Department of Statistics (1945). Village Statistics, April, 1945.
- Guérin, V. (1875). Description Géographique Historique et Archéologique de la Palestine (in French). Vol. 2: Samarie, pt. 2. Paris: L'Imprimerie Nationale.
- Hadawi, S. (1970). Village Statistics of 1945: A Classification of Land and Area ownership in Palestine. Palestine Liberation Organization Research Centre. Archived from the original on 8 December 2018.
- Hartmann, M. (1883). "Die Ortschaftenliste des Liwa Jerusalem in dem türkischen Staatskalender für Syrien auf das Jahr 1288 der Flucht (1871)". Zeitschrift des Deutschen Palästina-Vereins. 6: 102–149.
- Hütteroth, W.-D.; Abdulfattah, K. (1977). Historical Geography of Palestine, Transjordan and Southern Syria in the Late 16th Century. Erlanger Geographische Arbeiten, Sonderband 5. Erlangen, Germany: Vorstand der Fränkischen Geographischen Gesellschaft. ISBN 3-920405-41-2.
- Le Strange, G. (1890). Palestine Under the Moslems: A Description of Syria and the Holy Land from A.D. 650 to 1500. London: Committee of the Palestine Exploration Fund.
- Mills, E., ed. (1932). Census of Palestine 1931. Population of Villages, Towns and Administrative Areas. Jerusalem: Government of Palestine.
- Palmer, E.H. (1881). The Survey of Western Palestine: Arabic and English Name Lists Collected During the Survey by Lieutenants Conder and Kitchener, R. E. Transliterated and Explained by E.H. Palmer. Committee of the Palestine Exploration Fund.
- Petersen, Andrew (2005). The Towns of Palestine Under Muslim Rule. British Archaeological Reports. ISBN 1841718211.
- Pringle, D. (1993). The Churches of the Crusader Kingdom of Jerusalem: A-K (excluding Acre and Jerusalem). Vol. 1. Cambridge University Press. ISBN 9780521390361. (pp. 17 – 23
- Pringle, D. (2009). The Churches of the Crusader Kingdom of Jerusalem: The cities of Acre and Tyre with Addenda and Corrigenda to Volumes I-III. Vol. IV. Cambridge University Press. ISBN 978-0-521-85148-0.
- Robinson, E.; Smith, E. (1841). Biblical Researches in Palestine, Mount Sinai and Arabia Petraea: A Journal of Travels in the year 1838. Vol. 3. Boston: Crocker & Brewster.
- Röhricht, R. (1893). (RRH) Regesta regni Hierosolymitani (MXCVII-MCCXCI) (in Latin). Berlin: Libraria Academica Wageriana. (RRH, p. 113, No. 433), (RRH, pp. 137–138, No. 518), (RRH, p. 145, No. 547), ( RRH, pp. 258–260, No. 983)
- Röhricht, R. (1904). (RRH Ad) Regesta regni Hierosolymitani Additamentum (in Latin). Berlin@: Libraria Academica Wageriana. (RRH Ad, p. 28, No. 458a)
- Schick, C. (1896). "Zur Einwohnerzahl des Bezirks Jerusalem". Zeitschrift des Deutschen Palästina-Vereins. 19: 120–127.
- Socin, A. (1879). "Alphabetisches Verzeichniss von Ortschaften des Paschalik Jerusalem". Zeitschrift des Deutschen Palästina-Vereins. 2: 135–163.
