= Mount Nabi Yunis, Palestine =

Mountain in Hebron, West Bank, Palestine

Nabi Yunis
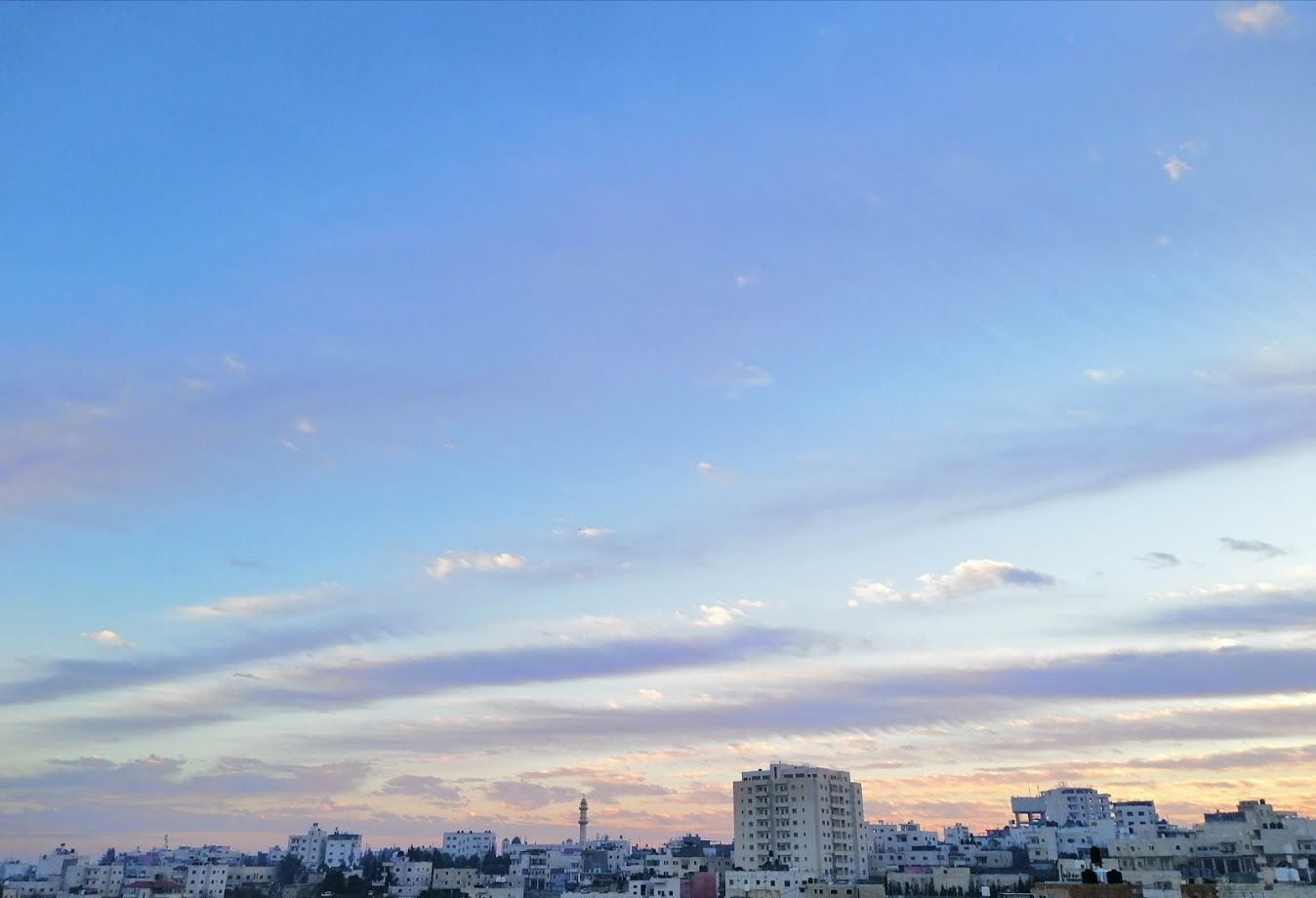
- View from the mount

Highest point
- Elevation: 1,030 m (3,380 ft)
- Coordinates: 31°34′46″N 35°6′18″E

Geography
- Location within State of Palestine
- Location: Halhul, West Bank, Palestinian territories
- Parent range: Mount Hebron

Nabi Yunis (Arabic: جبل النبي يونس) is the highest point in the State of Palestine, with an altitude of 1,030 metres (3,380 ft). It is located in the town of Halhul, Hebron Governorate, and is part of the Judean Mountains (also known as the Hebron Hills).

== See also ==
- Geography of the Palestinian territories
- Geography of the West Bank
- Tall Asur, one of the highest points in the West Bank (1,016 m / 3,333 ft)
- List of countries by highest point (Countries with disputed sovereignty)
