= Baal-hazor =

Baal-hazor (Hebrew: בַּעַל חָצוֹר, lit. 'Baal's village') was a village in the ancient Kingdom of Israel. Located on the border of Ephraim and Benjamin, it is where Absalom held the feast of sheep-shearing when Amnon was assassinated, according to 2 Samuel 13:23. It is probably identical with Hazor mentioned in Nehemiah 11:33.

Baal-hazor is identified with Tell Asur, a 1,016 meters high mountain 8 km north-east of Bethel. It is the highest mountain in Samaria and one of the highest mountains in the West Bank.

== See also ==
- Hazor (disambiguation)
