= Al-Lubban al-Gharbi =

al-Lubban al-Gharbi
- Municipality type D (Village council)

Arabic transcription(s)
  - Arabic: اللبّن الغربيّ
  - Latin: al-Lubban al-Gharbiya (official) al-Lubban (unofficial)
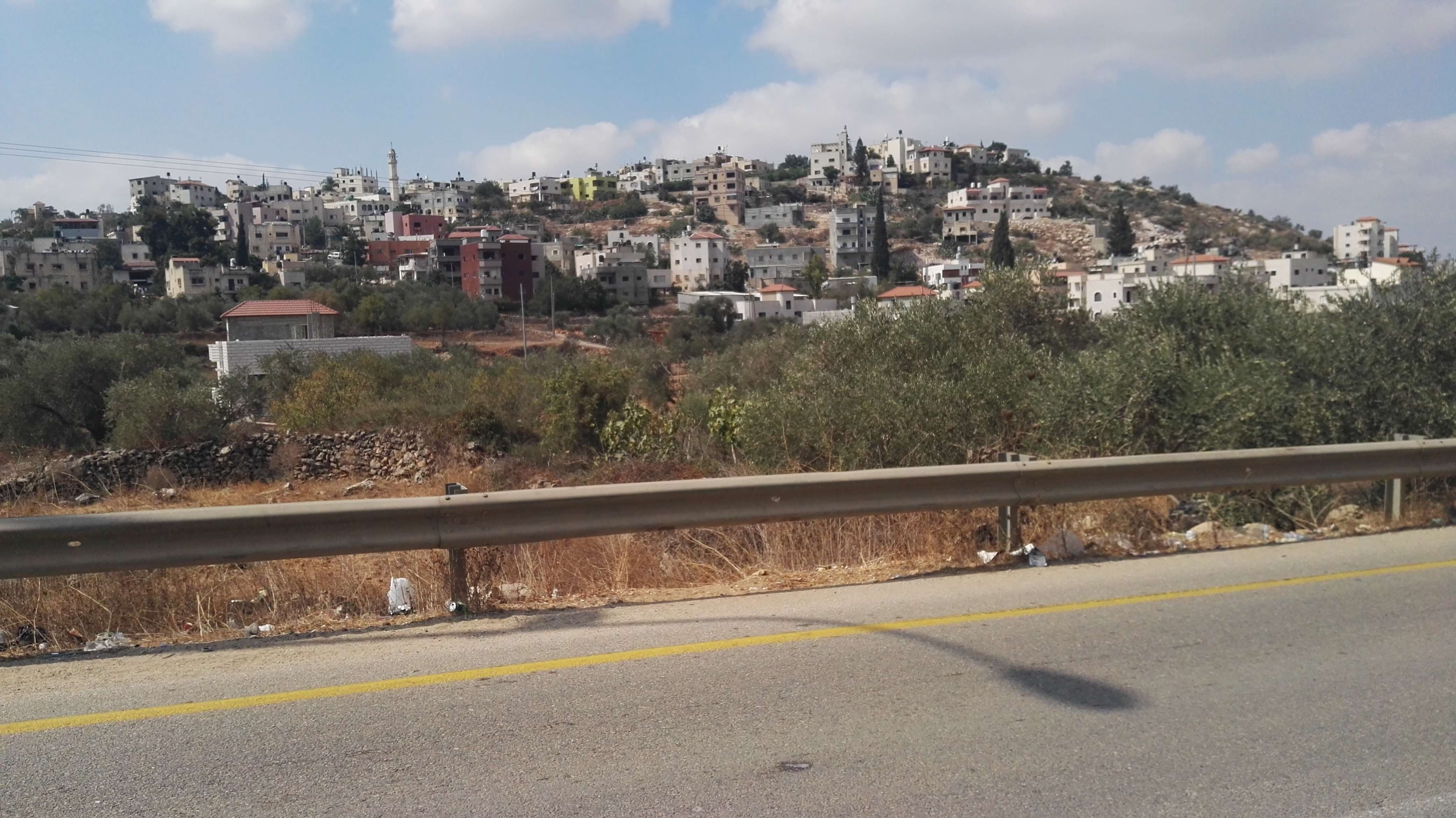
- al-Lubban al-Gharbi from the north

- Location of al-Lubban al-Gharbi within Palestine
- Coordinates: 32°02′04″N 35°02′22″E
- Palestine grid: 153/160
- State: State of Palestine
- Governorate: Ramallah and al-Bireh

Government
  - Type: Village council

Area
  - Total: 9.7 km^{2} (3.7 sq mi)
- Elevation: 269 m (883 ft)

Population (2017)
  - Total: 1,566
  - Density: 160/km^{2} (420/sq mi)
- Name meaning: "The milk-white spot of Rentis"

Al-Lubban al-Gharbi (Arabic: اللبّن الغربيّ) is a Palestinian village in the Ramallah and al-Bireh Governorate, located 21 kilometers northwest of Ramallah in the northern West Bank. According to the Palestinian Central Bureau of Statistics, the village had a population of 1,566 inhabitants in 2017.

Al-Lubban al-Gharbi has a total land area of 9,694 dunams, of which 335 are built-up area. Most of the remaining land is either grown with olive and almond orchards or open for continued expansion of the village. However, the Israeli West Bank barrier will separate 59% of Lubban al-Gharbi's land from the village's urban area. The village's infrastructure facilities include an elementary school a kindergarten, and two clinics.

== Location ==
Al Lubban al Gharbi is located (horizontally) 21.2 kilometers (13.2 mi) north-west of Ramallah. It is bordered by Bani Zeid and 'Abud to the east, Deir Ballut to the north, Rantis and Israel to the west, and 'Abud to the south.

== History ==
The village is located at an ancient site on the slopes of a hill. Potsherds from the IA I-II (apparently the 10th and early 9th centuries B.C.E.), have been found, and from the IA II, Persian, Roman, Byzantine/Umayyad, Crusader/Ayyubid, Mamluk and early Ottoman era.

There are remains of ancient buildings, the stones of which have been reused in some the village's inhabited houses. In the courtyard of the village mosque are the bases of five columns that may have formed part of a chapel. Also in the village are cisterns carved into the rock, and on the slopes of a neighboring hill to the southwest, there are tombs and grottos carved into the rock.

The village has been identified with Beit Laban of the Mishnah, a place mentioned alongside Beit Rima as a town in the mountain region renowned for its wine, which was conveyed to Jerusalem (Menachot 8:6).

Al-Lubban al-Gharbi has also been identified with the Crusader Luban, or Oliban, mentioned in connection with nearby Casale St. Maria.

=== Ottoman era ===
The village was incorporated into the Ottoman Empire in 1517 with all of Palestine, and in 1596 it appeared in the tax registers under the name Lubban al-Kafr. It was located in the Nahiya of Jabal Qubal, part of Nablus Sanjak, with a population of 29 Muslim households. The villagers paid a fixed tax rate of 33.3% on various agricultural products, such as wheat, barley, summer crops, olives, goats and beehives in addition to "occasional revenues"; a total of 6,954 akçe.

In 1838, it was noted as a Muslim village, Lubban Rentis, in Jurat Merda, south of Nablus.

French explorer Victor Guérin visited the village in 1863, and noted that "The houses appear to be very ancient, and present the particularity that many of them form together a continued whole, as if they were all one house, now divided among separate families. A quantity of ancient materials may be observed in the walls." He further noted that the village had 300 inhabitants.

In 1870/1871 (1288 AH), an Ottoman census listed the village with a population of 37 households in the nahiya (sub-district) of Jamma'in al-Awwal, subordinate to Nablus.

In 1882 PEF's Survey of Western Palestine (SWP), the village, (called "Lubban Rentis"), was described a being small, and situated on a knoll beside a Roman road.

=== British Mandate era ===
In the 1922 census of Palestine conducted by the British Mandate authorities, Lubban had a population 221 inhabitants, all Muslims, increasing in the 1931 census when the village, with the name Al-Lubban or Lubban Rantis, had 60 occupied houses and a population of 298 Muslims.

In the 1945 statistics the population of El Lubban was 340, all Muslims, who owned 9,854 dunams of land according to an official land and population survey. 1,411 dunams were plantations and irrigable land, 1,118 used for cereals, while 6 dunams were built-up (urban) land.

=== Jordanian era ===
In the wake of the 1948 Arab–Israeli War, and after the 1949 Armistice Agreements, Al-Lubban al-Gharbi came under Jordanian rule.

The Jordanian census of 1961 found 602 inhabitants in Lubban.

=== 1967-present ===
Since the Six-Day War in 1967, Al-Lubban al-Gharbi has been under Israeli occupation.

After the 1995 accords, 2.9% of village land was classified as Area B, he remaining 97.1% as Area C. Israel has confiscated land from Al-Lubban al-Gharbi in order to construct the Israeli settlements of Beit Aryeh and Ofarim.

== See also ==
- Al-Lubban ash-Sharqiya

== Bibliography ==
- Barron, J.B., ed. (1923). Palestine: Report and General Abstracts of the Census of 1922. Government of Palestine.
- Conder, C.R.; Kitchener, H.H. (1882). The Survey of Western Palestine: Memoirs of the Topography, Orography, Hydrography, and Archaeology. Vol. 2. London: Committee of the Palestine Exploration Fund.
- Dauphin, C. (1998). La Palestine byzantine, Peuplement et Populations. BAR International Series 726 (in French). Vol. III : Catalogue. Oxford: Archeopress. ISBN 0-860549-05-4.
- Finkelstein, I.; Lederman, Zvi, eds. (1997). Highlands of many cultures. Tel Aviv: Institute of Archaeology of Tel Aviv University Publications Section. ISBN 965-440-007-3.
- Government of Jordan, Department of Statistics (1964). First Census of Population and Housing. Volume I: Final Tables; General Characteristics of the Population (PDF).
- Government of Palestine, Department of Statistics (1945). Village Statistics, April, 1945.
- Guérin, V. (1875). Description Géographique Historique et Archéologique de la Palestine (in French). Vol. 2: Samarie, pt. 2. Paris: L'Imprimerie Nationale.
- Hadawi, S. (1970). Village Statistics of 1945: A Classification of Land and Area ownership in Palestine. Palestine Liberation Organization Research Center. Archived from the original on 2018-12-08.
- Hütteroth, W.-D.; Abdulfattah, K. (1977). Historical Geography of Palestine, Transjordan and Southern Syria in the Late 16th Century. Erlanger Geographische Arbeiten, Sonderband 5. Erlangen, Germany: Vorstand der Fränkischen Geographischen Gesellschaft. ISBN 3-920405-41-2.
- Mills, E., ed. (1932). Census of Palestine 1931. Population of Villages, Towns and Administrative Areas. Jerusalem: Government of Palestine.
- Neubauer, A. (1868). La géographie du Talmud : mémoire couronné par l'Académie des inscriptions et belles-lettres (in French). Paris: Lévy.
- Palmer, E.H. (1881). The Survey of Western Palestine: Arabic and English Name Lists Collected During the Survey by Lieutenants Conder and Kitchener, R. E. Transliterated and Explained by E.H. Palmer. Committee of the Palestine Exploration Fund.
- Robinson, E.; Smith, E. (1841). Biblical Researches in Palestine, Mount Sinai and Arabia Petraea: A Journal of Travels in the year 1838. Vol. 3. Boston: Crocker & Brewster.
- Röhricht, R. (1893). (RRH) Regesta regni Hierosolymitani (MXCVII-MCCXCI) (in Latin). Berlin: Libraria Academica Wageriana.
