= Tall Asur =

Hill in the West Bank

- Ba'al Hazor; Mount Hazor
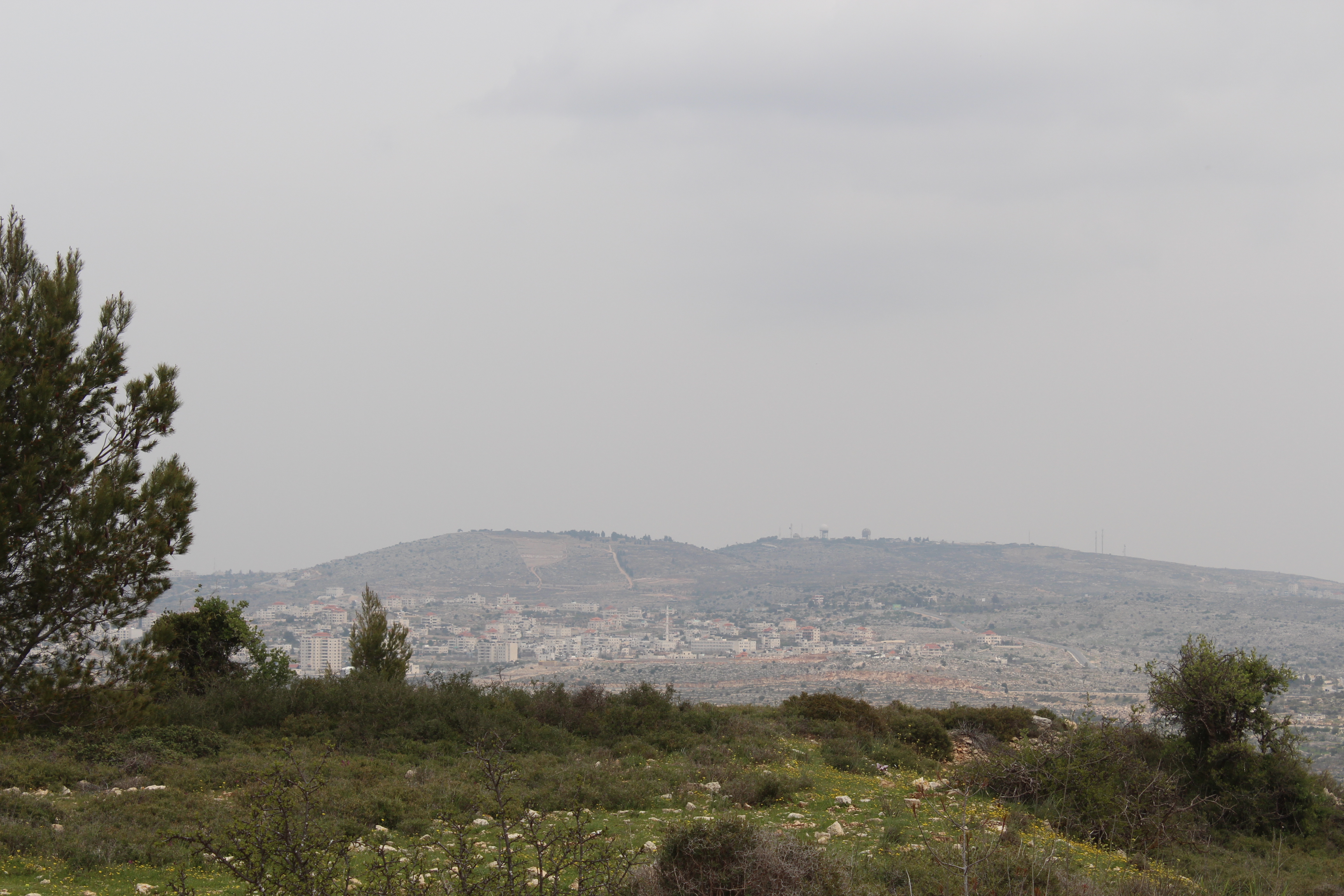
- Ba'al Hazor as seen from Beit El

Highest point
- Elevation: 1,016 m (3,333 ft)
- Coordinates: 31°58′43″N 35°17′10″E

Naming
- Native name: تل العاصور (Arabic); בַּעַל חָצוֹר (Hebrew)

Geography
- Location within the West Bank
- Location: West Bank

Tall Asur (Arabic: تل العاصور), (Hebrew: Ba'al-hazor (Hebrew: בַּעַל חָצוֹר; also Hebrew: רמת חָצוֹר, romanized: Ramat Hazor Mount Hazor), is an irregularly shaped plateau, marking the geographical boundary between Samaria to its north and Judea to its south. It is one of the highest points in the West Bank of the State of Palestine; with an altitude of approximately 1,020 metres (3,350 ft) above sea level. It is surrounded by the villages of Silwad, Taybeh, Kafr Malik and Al-Mazra'a ash-Sharqiya and the Israeli settlement of Ofra.

It is identified with the biblical site of Ba'al-hazor, a place in Samaria on the border of Ephraim and Benjamin where Absalom held the feast of sheep-shearing when Amnon was assassinated. (Note: According to 2 Samuel 13:23. It is probably identical with Hazor mentioned in Nehemiah 11:33.) If that is correct, the modern Arabic place name preserves the original Biblical name.

== Etymology ==
Its name is derived from the word for "courtyard", referring to the walled enclosures that this large land mass enabled ancients to construct. These enclosures served as seasonal pens for sheep that were brought there for shearing, which was accompanied by a festive gathering. The peak housed a pagan shrine for worship of a Baal (deity) who was considered "lord of the mountain", hence its name: "Baal-hazor".

The Genesis Apocryphon of the Dead Sea scrolls identifies Ramat Hazor as the site between Bethel and Ai where Abraham built an altar and invoked the name of God (Gen. 12:1–9). At this site the accounts of Genesis 13:14–17 took place. (Note: Genesis 13:14–17: The Lord said to Abram after Lot had parted from him, “Look around from where you are, to the north and south, to the east and west. All the land that you see I will give to you and your offspring forever. I will make your offspring like the dust of the earth, so that if anyone could count the dust, then your offspring could be counted. Go, walk through the length and breadth of the land, for I am giving it to you...”)

== Modern use ==
The mountain has two peaks, one of which is an IAF base.

== See also ==
- Geography of Palestine
- Geography of the West Bank
- Mount Nabi Yunis, the highest point in the State of Palestine.

== Sources ==
- Tall Asur - Peakbagger.com. Retrieved on 2011-02-04.
