= Beit Aryeh-Ofarim =

Coordinates: 32°2′15″N 35°2′59″E

Beit Aryeh: בֵּית אַרְיֵה־עֳפָרִים; بيت آريه
- Local council (from 1989)
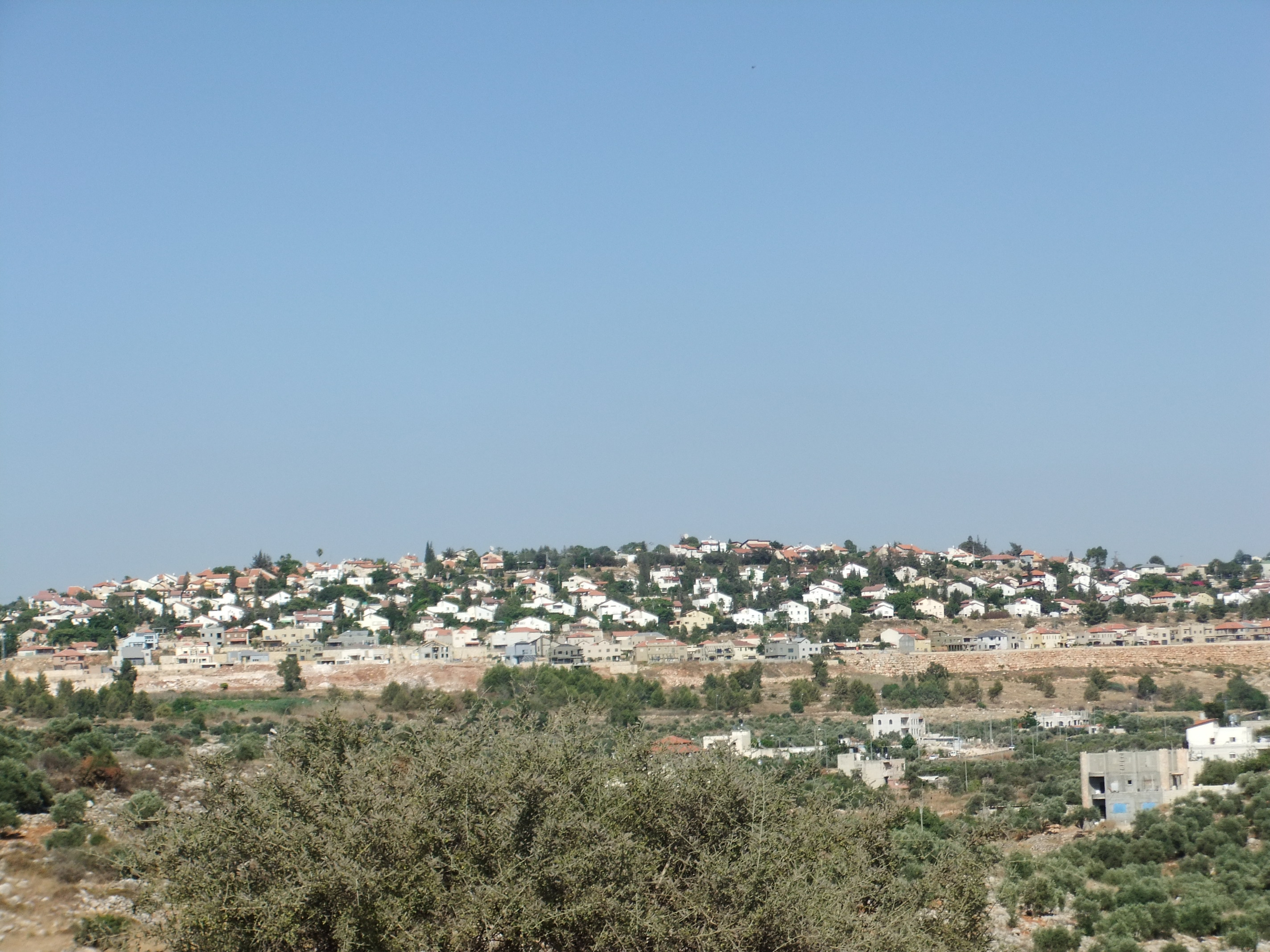
- Interactive map of Beit Aryeh
- Location within the Central West Bank
- Region: West Bank
- District: Judea and Samaria Area
- Governorate: Ramallah and al-Bireh Governorate
- Founded: 1981

Government
  - Head of Municipality: Yehuda Elboim

Area
  - Total: 8,500 dunams (8.5 km^{2}; 3.3 sq mi)

Population (2024)
  - Total: 5,627
  - Density: 660/km^{2} (1,700/sq mi)
- Name meaning: House of Aryeh - Fawns

Beit Aryeh-Ofarim (Hebrew: בֵּית אַרְיֵה־עֳפָרִים) is an Israeli settlement and local council in the northern West Bank. It is located 32 kilometers (20 mi) north of Jerusalem and 25 kilometers (16 mi) east of Tel Aviv, near the Palestinian village of al-Lubban al-Gharbi, 3.8 km kilometers east of the Green Line. It is situated on the Palestinian side of the Israeli West Bank barrier, on 8,500 dunams of land. In 2024 it had a population of 5,627.

Israeli settlements in the West Bank are considered illegal under international law, but the Israeli government disputes this.

Khirbat Khudash is an archaeological site located within Beit Aryeh. It is a well-planned fortified settlement associated with olive-oil production, dated to the 8th century BCE and linked to the Northern Kingdom of Israel.

== History ==
Established in 1981, Beit Aryeh was recognised as a local council in 1989. In 2004, it merged with Ofarim. Beit Aryeh was named for former Knesset member Aryeh Ben-Eliezer, a prominent Revisionist Zionist leader who was amongst the founders of Herut.

According to ARIJ, the land for Beit Aryeh-Ofarim was confiscated by Israel from two nearby Palestinian villages: Aboud and Al-Lubban al-Gharbi.

In 2011, the Israeli Ministry of Defense signed an agreement with the municipality of Beit Aryeh approving the construction of 100 homes and a bypass road between Beit Aryeh and Ofarim.

In 2020, Beit Aryeh-Ofarim was one of several Israeli settlements that dumped its untreated sewage onto lands of the nearby Palestinian village of Deir Ballut.

== Voting Patterns ==
In the 2022 election, 65 percent of voters in Beit Aryeh-Ofarim voted for the parties of the right-wing coalition led by Benjamin Netanyahu, while 30 percent voted for the parties of the center-left coalition led by Yair Lapid. The Arab parties did not receive any votes.

In the 2026 election, 59 percent of voters in Beit Aryeh-Ofarim voted for the parties of the right-wing coalition led by Benjamin Netanyahu, while 32 percent voted for the parties of the center-left coalition led by Gadi Eisenkot. An additional 5.4 percent voted for the Reservists, and 3.4 percent voted for Amcha Yisrael. The Arab parties did not receive any votes. Voter turnout increased 24 percent from the 2022 election.

== Notable residents ==
- Doron Matalon
- Aleks Tarn
- Neil Druckmann
