= Geography of Palestine =

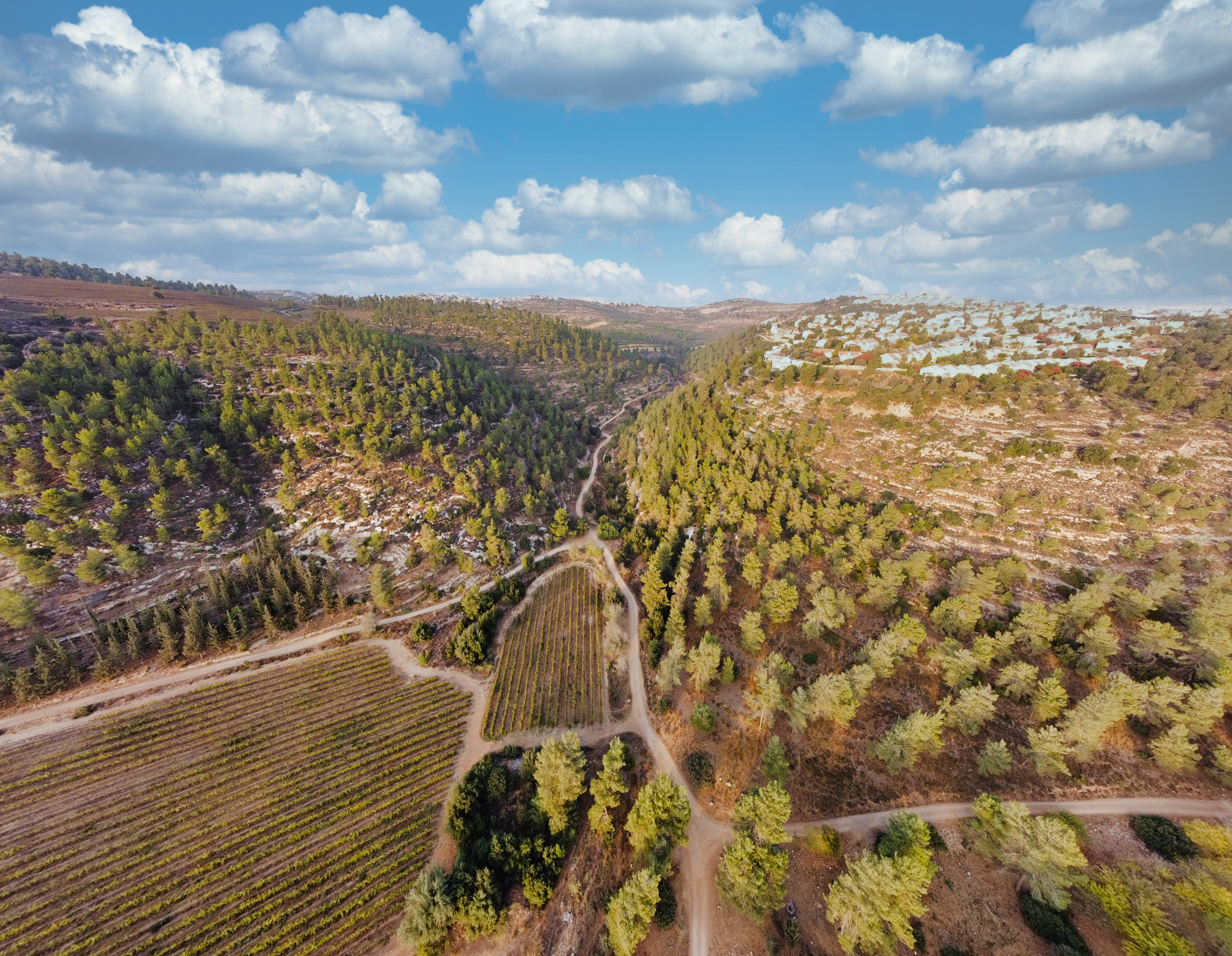
Nahal Ksalon riverbed near Mevasseret Zion and Beit Surik in Jerusalem

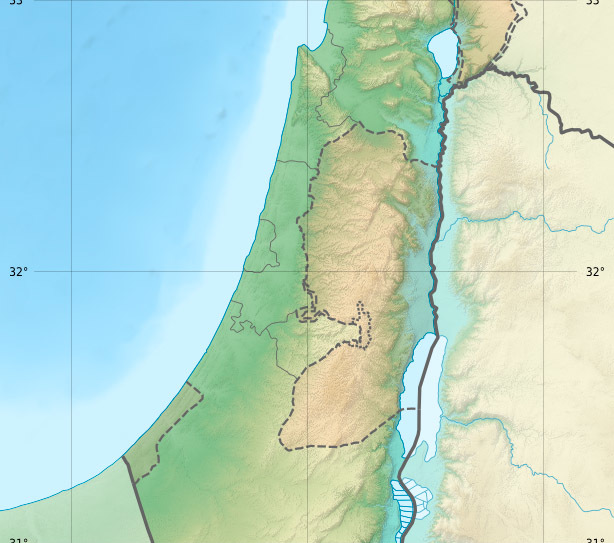
Map of Palestine

Palestine is the 163rd largest country in the world, in terms of claimed areas. The country is bordered by Israel to the east, north and west, Jordan to the east, Egypt to the southwest and the Mediterranean Sea to the west. The country also shares maritime borders with Israel, Cyprus and Egypt. Located in the Levant, Palestine is part of the Middle Eastern region in Asia.

== Physiographic regions ==
The terrain of the Gaza Strip is flat or rolling, with dunes near the coast. The highest point is Abu 'Awdah (Joz Abu 'Auda), at 105 m (344 ft) above sea level.

The terrain of the West Bank is mostly rugged dissected upland, with some vegetation in the west, but somewhat barren in the east. The elevation span reaches from a low on the northern shore of the Dead Sea at 429 m (1,407 ft) below sea level, to the highest point at Mount Nabi Yunis at 1,030 m (3,380 ft) above sea level. The area of the West Bank is landlocked; the highlands are the main recharge area for Israel's coastal aquifers.

== Geology ==
The coastal plain of Gaza is composed of sand dunes and fertile sandy sediments. Except for a porous calcareous sandstone called kurkar in Arabic, there are no other rocks in this region. In contrast, the West Bank is dominated by low mountains: Mount Gerizim (881m), Nabi Samwil (890m), and Mount Scopus (826m). The rocks are principally composed of marine sediments (limestone and dolomite). The porosity of these rocks permits water to filter down to the non-porous strata, which supply water to the numerous aquifers in the region.

=== Tectonics and seismic activity ===
The Jordan Valley is a segment of the Dead Sea Transform, a continuation of the Great Rift Valley which separates the African Plate from the Arabian Plate. The entire segment is thought to have ruptured repeatedly, for instance during the earthquake of 749 and again in 1033, the most recent major earthquake along this structure. The deficit in slip that has built up since the 1033 event is sufficient to cause an earthquake of Mw~7.4.

The tectonic disposition of Palestine on the margin of the Dead Sea Transform has left it exposed to relatively frequent earthquakes, the most destructive of which were those of 31 BCE, 363, 749, and 1033. For a detailed list see here.

== Rivers and lakes ==
The River Jordan is the largest river in Palestine, forming the eastern boundary of the West Bank, until it flows into the Dead Sea. Friends of the Earth Middle East reports that on the one hand up to 96% of the river's fresh water is diverted by Israel, Jordan and Syria, while on the other hand large quantities of untreated sewage are being discharged into the river.

The Dead Sea is the largest body of water in Palestine, while the valley of Marj Sanur forms a seasonal lake.

A number of ephemeral streams, in Arabic called wadis, flow into the Jordan River or Dead Sea through the West Bank, including Wadi Og, Wadi Fa'rah and Wadi Qelt. Others flow through Israel and into the Mediterranean Sea, such as Hadera Stream and Wadi Kabiba.

Palestine also has several culturally significant water features, including Birkat Al-Karmel, Hezekiah's Pool, the Pool of Bethesda, the Pool of Siloam, Solomon's Pools, and the Sultan's Pool.

== Climate ==
Köppen-Geiger climate classification map for Palestine

The climate in the West Bank is mostly Mediterranean, slightly cooler at elevated areas compared with the shoreline, west to the area. In the east, the West Bank includes much of the Judean Desert, including the western shoreline of the Dead Sea, characterised by dry and hot climate.

Gaza has a hot semi-arid climate (Köppen: BSh) with mild winters and dry hot summers. Spring arrives around March–April and the hottest months are July and August, with the average high being 33 °C (91 °F). The coldest month is January with temperatures usually at 7 °C (45 °F). Rain is scarce and generally falls between November and March, with annual precipitation rates approximately at 4.57 inches (116 mm).

Climate data for Gaza
Month	Jan	Feb	Mar	Apr	May	Jun	Jul	Aug	Sep	Oct	Nov	Dec	Year
Mean daily maximum °C (°F)	17 (62)	17 (63)	20 (69)	26 (78)	29 (84)	31 (89)	33 (91)	33 (91)	31 (88)	28 (83)	24 (75)	19 (65)	26 (78)
Mean daily minimum °C (°F)	7 (45)	7 (45)	9 (49)	13 (55)	15 (60)	18 (65)	20 (69)	21 (70)	19 (66)	17 (62)	12 (54)	8 (47)	14 (57)
Average precipitation mm (inches)	76 (3.0)	49 (1.9)	37 (1.5)	6 (0.2)	3 (0.1)	0 (0)	0 (0)	0 (0)	0 (0)	14 (0.6)	46 (1.8)	70 (2.8)	301 (11.9)
Source: Weatherbase

Climate data for Jericho
Month	Jan	Feb	Mar	Apr	May	Jun	Jul	Aug	Sep	Oct	Nov	Dec	Year
Mean daily maximum °C (°F)	19.0 (66.2)	20.6 (69.1)	24.4 (75.9)	29.5 (85.1)	34.4 (93.9)	37.0 (98.6)	38.6 (101.5)	37.9 (100.2)	35.8 (96.4)	32.7 (90.9)	28.1 (82.6)	21.4 (70.5)	30.0 (86.0)
Daily mean °C (°F)	10.7 (51.3)	12.6 (54.7)	16.3 (61.3)	22.4 (72.3)	26.6 (79.9)	30.4 (86.7)	30.9 (87.6)	30.4 (86.7)	28.6 (83.5)	25.8 (78.4)	22.8 (73.0)	16.9 (62.4)	22.9 (73.2)
Mean daily minimum °C (°F)	4.4 (39.9)	5.9 (42.6)	9.6 (49.3)	13.6 (56.5)	18.2 (64.8)	20.2 (68.4)	21.9 (71.4)	21.1 (70.0)	20.5 (68.9)	17.6 (63.7)	16.6 (61.9)	11.6 (52.9)	15.1 (59.2)
Average precipitation mm (inches)	59 (2.3)	44 (1.7)	20 (0.8)	4 (0.2)	1 (0.0)	0 (0)	0 (0)	1 (0.0)	2 (0.1)	3 (0.1)	5 (0.2)	65 (2.6)	204 (8.0)
Average relative humidity (%)	77	81	74	62	49	50	51	57	52	56	54	74	61
Mean monthly sunshine hours	189.1	186.5	244.9	288.0	362.7	393.0	418.5	396.8	336.0	294.5	249.0	207.7	3,566.7
Mean daily sunshine hours	6.1	6.6	7.9	9.6	11.7	13.1	13.5	12.8	11.2	9.5	8.3	6.7	9.8
Source: Arab Meteorology Book

Climate data for Jerusalem (1881–2007)
Month	Jan	Feb	Mar	Apr	May	Jun	Jul	Aug	Sep	Oct	Nov	Dec	Year
Record high °C (°F)	23.4 (74.1)	25.3 (77.5)	27.6 (81.7)	35.3 (95.5)	37.2 (99.0)	36.8 (98.2)	40.6 (105.1)	44.4 (111.9)	37.8 (100.0)	33.8 (92.8)	29.4 (84.9)	26.0 (78.8)	44.4 (111.9)
Mean daily maximum °C (°F)	11.8 (53.2)	12.6 (54.7)	15.4 (59.7)	21.5 (70.7)	25.3 (77.5)	27.6 (81.7)	29.0 (84.2)	29.4 (84.9)	28.2 (82.8)	24.7 (76.5)	18.8 (65.8)	14.0 (57.2)	21.5 (70.7)
Daily mean °C (°F)	9.1 (48.4)	9.5 (49.1)	11.9 (53.4)	17.1 (62.8)	20.5 (68.9)	22.7 (72.9)	24.2 (75.6)	24.5 (76.1)	23.4 (74.1)	20.7 (69.3)	15.6 (60.1)	11.2 (52.2)	17.5 (63.6)
Mean daily minimum °C (°F)	6.4 (43.5)	6.4 (43.5)	8.4 (47.1)	12.6 (54.7)	15.7 (60.3)	17.8 (64.0)	19.4 (66.9)	19.5 (67.1)	18.6 (65.5)	16.6 (61.9)	12.3 (54.1)	8.4 (47.1)	13.5 (56.3)
Record low °C (°F)	−6.7 (19.9)	−2.4 (27.7)	−0.3 (31.5)	0.8 (33.4)	7.6 (45.7)	11.0 (51.8)	14.6 (58.3)	15.5 (59.9)	13.2 (55.8)	9.8 (49.6)	1.8 (35.2)	0.2 (32.4)	−6.7 (19.9)
Average rainfall mm (inches)	133.2 (5.24)	118.3 (4.66)	92.7 (3.65)	24.5 (0.96)	3.2 (0.13)	0 (0)	0 (0)	0 (0)	0.3 (0.01)	15.4 (0.61)	60.8 (2.39)	105.7 (4.16)	554.1 (21.81)
Average rainy days	12.9	11.7	9.6	4.4	1.3	0	0	0	0.3	3.6	7.3	10.9	62.0
Average relative humidity (%)	61	59	52	39	35	37	40	40	40	42	48	56	46
Mean monthly sunshine hours	192.2	243.6	226.3	267.0	331.7	381.0	384.4	365.8	309.0	275.9	228.0	192.2	3,397.1
Source 1: Israel Meteorological Service
Source 2: Hong Kong Observatory for data of sunshine hours

== Natural resources ==
Natural resources of Palestine include mud extracts from the Dead Sea, such as magnesium, potash and bromine. However, these resources are monopolised by Israeli settlements; the Palestinian policy network Al-Shabaka reported in 2015 that the added value access to these natural resources could have delivered to the economy was $918 million per annum.

== Environmental issues ==
Palestine has a number of environmental issues; issues facing the Gaza Strip include desertification; salination of fresh water; sewage treatment; water-borne diseases; soil degradation; and depletion and contamination of underground water resources. In the West Bank, many of the same issues apply; although fresh water is much more plentiful, access is restricted by the ongoing occupation of Palestine.

== See also ==
- Tourism in Palestine
