= Birkat Al-Karmel =

Historical pond in the town of Al-Karmel south of Hebron, West bank

Birkat Al-Karmil
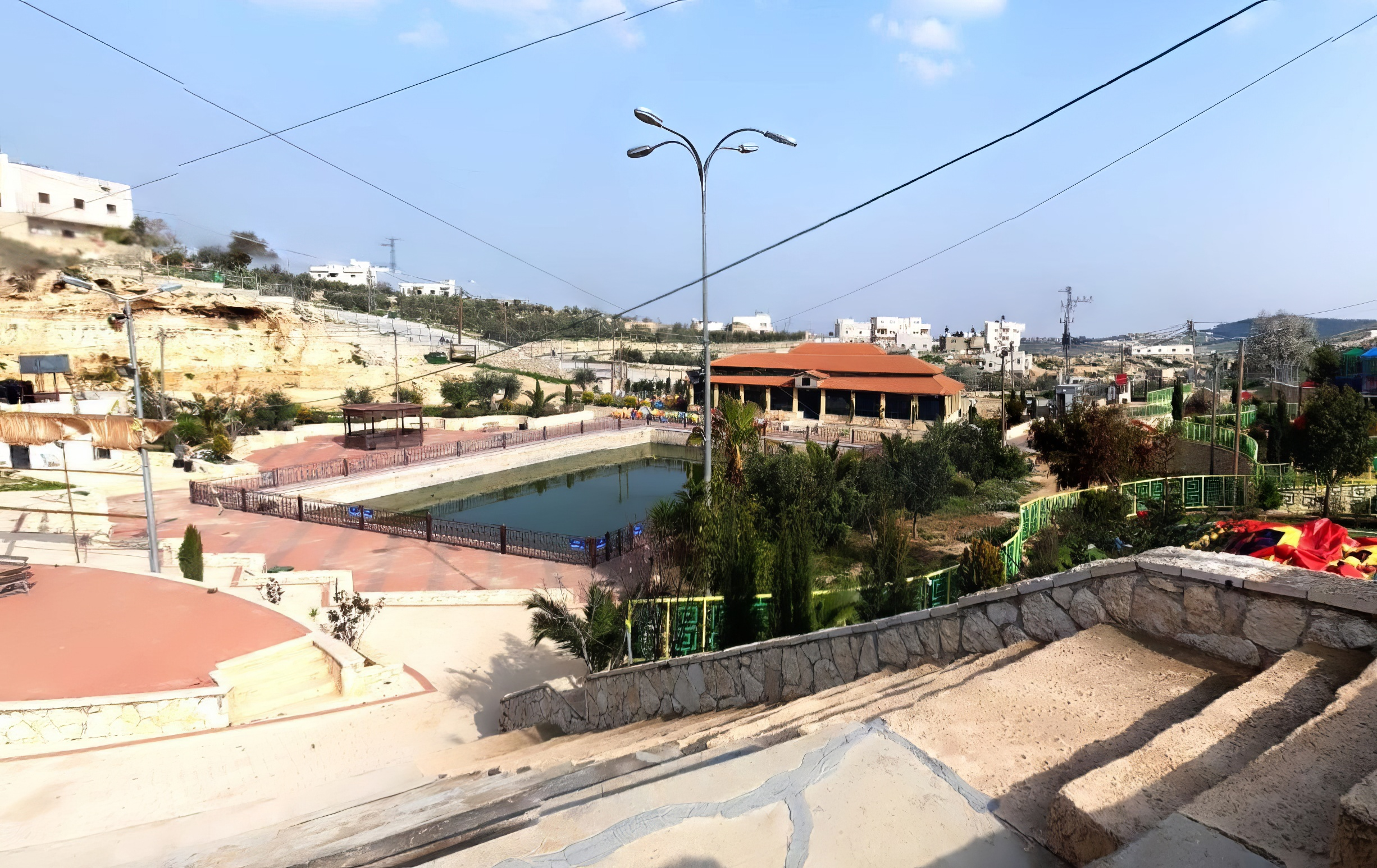
- Location: Palestine, al-Karmil
- Type: Pond

Birkat Al-Karmel (Arabic: بركة الكرمل الأثرية), is a historical pond located in the town of Al-Karmel south of Hebron, West Bank. Its history dates back to the Canaanite period, where it was used to collect water from pure springs flowing from the ancient stone quarry within the city. Because of the abundance of water, the pond played an important role in irrigating crops and watering livestock.

== Importance ==
The significance of Birkat Al-Karmel extends to later eras, serving as a crucial station on trade caravan routes from the Levant to West Africa. It also served as a destination for Muslim pilgrims coming from West Africa to the Levant and the Hejaz.

== Restoration ==
Historically, Birkat Al-Karmel underwent multiple restoration efforts to preserve its condition and enhance its services. In the Byzantine era, a second reservoir was excavated, and clay pipes were installed to connect the two reservoirs to accommodate excess water. During the Umayyad period, it was repaired to serve as a station for pilgrims and trade caravans between Egypt and the Levant.

In modern times, Birkat Al-Karmel has been rehabilitated to become a public park welcoming local residents and tourists. The municipality of Al-Karmel aims to sustain this transformation in collaboration with donor countries and supporting institutions.

== Challenges ==
Birkat Al-Karmel is subjected to repeated incursions by settlers under the protection of the Israeli forces, which consider that they have a historical right to the archaeological site. During most Jewish religious occasions, Israeli forces invade the town of Al-Karmel, completely closing its roads to secure settlers' entry to the site, accompanied by anti-Arab and anti-Muslim chants.
