= Emmanuel Guillaume-Rey =

French archaeologist and orientalist

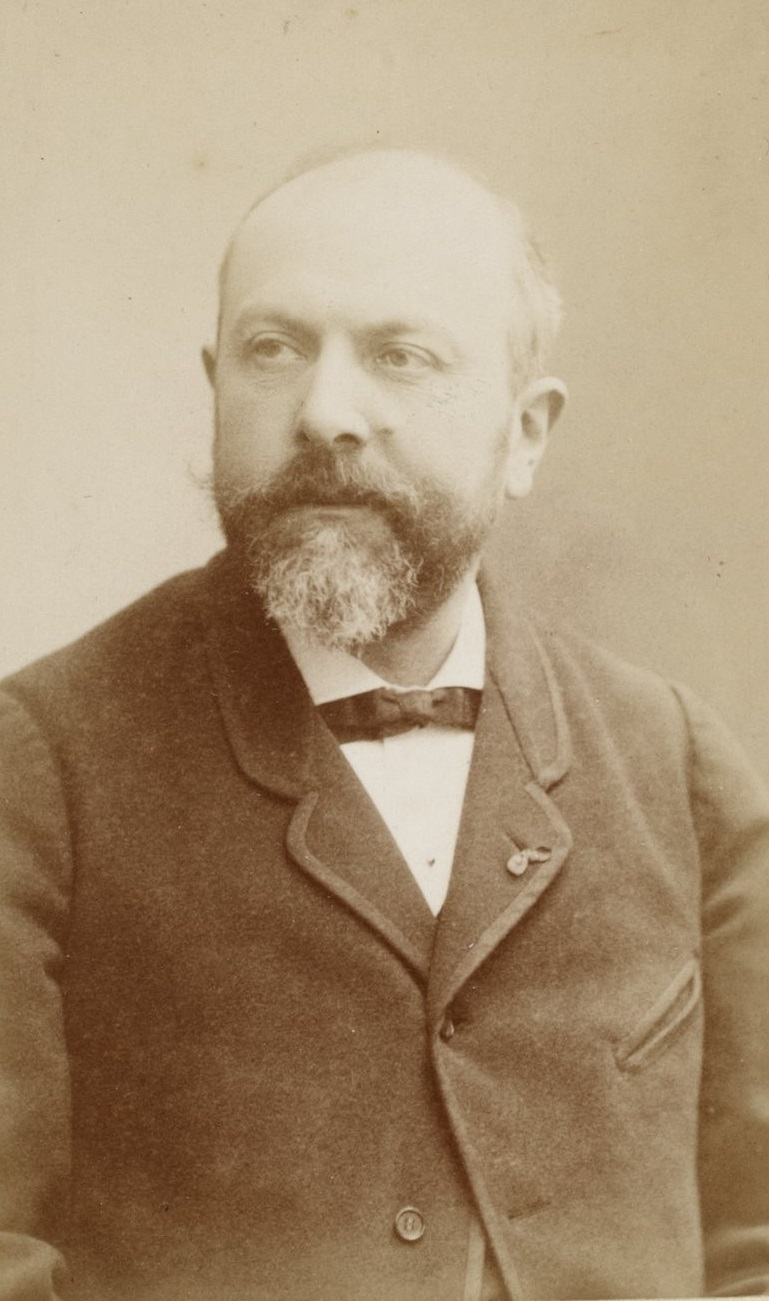
- Born: 28 May 1837; Chaumont, Haute-Marne, France
- Died: 4 April 1916 (aged 78); Chartres, France
- Known for: among the first archeologists of the Crusades

Academic work
- Discipline: archaeology
- Main interests: Crusader states military fortifications in the Near East

Baron Alban Emmanuel Guillaume-Rey (28 May 1837 – 4 April 1916) was a French archaeologist, topographer and orientalist. He is known for his historical works on Crusader states and on military fortifications in the Near East. He is considered by some as one of the first archaeologists of the Crusades.

== Biography ==
Alban Emmanuel Guillaume-Rey was born in Chaumont, Haute-Marne, on 28 May 1837. His surname combined the name of his father, François-Victor Guillaume and his mother Marie-Françoise-Louise-Florestine Rey.

On 4 April 1856, he was invited by one of his professors to the foundation of L'Œuvre d'Orient. The next year, at the age of twenty, Guillaume-Rey made his first trip to Syria, where he went to explore and study the Hauran region. In August 1859, he travelled with Louis De Clercq to Palestine. He made a final trip to the region in 1864.

On 19 December 1865, Guillaume-Rey was conferred by the Vatican the title of Knight of the Order of St. Gregory the Great. The following year, on 13 August 1866, he was awarded the title of Knight of the Legion of Honor and Foreign Orders as a publicist in charge of missions in the East. He also became a member in several learned societies such as the "Société archéologique d'Eure-et-Loir" in 1858. In addition, he donated his collections to the Louvre Museum, including a 'torso' which was found at Sarafand, Lebanon in 1875. Moreover, he gave away twenty-seven medals to the Musée des beaux-arts de Chartres, after his third trip to Syria, which were found in Marqab.

Guillaume-Rey was an officer in the French Army. During the Franco-Prussian War, he was stationed at Eure-et-Loir. In January 1871, he camped with his troops at the Château de Lauresse in Sarthe. Later on, he learned that the castle was for sale, which he acquired on 6 May 1877, and maintained it until his death in Chartres on 4 April 1916. The castle then went to his only daughter, Baroness de Loynes du Houlay, who kept it until her death in 1959, after bequeathing it to her niece Madame d'Hebray de Pouzals, born Nicole de Loynes du Houlay.

== Works ==
- Voyage dans le Haouran et aux bords de la Mer Morte exécuté pendant les années 1857 et 1858, 20 pl. : 50 x 64 cm, Édition A. Bertrand, Paris, 1861.
- Étude historique et topographique de la tribu de Juda, Gr. in-4°, 164 p., fig., pl. et carte, Édition A. Bertrand, Paris, 1862.
- Essai sur la domination française en Syrie durant le Moyen Age, 1 vol. (49 p.), Édition : 1866, impr. de E. Thunot, Paris.
- Reconnaissance de la montagne des Ansariés et d'une partie du pachalik d'Alep, 1 flle : 35 x 45 cm, Bulletin de la Société de géographie, juin 1866, Échelle de la carte 1:500000, Imprimerie de Janson, Paris, 1866.
- Reconnaissance de la montagne des Ansariès, In-8°, 37 p., carte, Extrait du Bulletin de la Société de géographie, Édition impr. de E. Martinet, Paris, 1866.
- Les Familles d'Outre-Mer et de Du Cange, In-4°, Bibliogr. p. [971]-991 pp. Index, Collection Inédits sur l'Histoire de France, Édition Imprimerie impériale, Paris, 1869.
- Rapport sur une mission scientifique accomplie en 1864-1865, dans le nord de la Syrie, In-8°, 45 p., carte, Extrait des Archives des missions scientifiques et littéraires. T. III. 2^{e} série, Édition Impr. impériale, Paris, 1877.
- Étude sur les monuments de l'architecture militaire des croisés en Syrie et dans l'île de Chypre, 1 vol. (288 p.-XXIX p. de pl.), Index, Édition Impr. nationale, Paris, 1871.
- La Société civile dans les principautés franques de Syrie, In-8°, 25 p., Extrait du Cabinet historique. T. XXV, Édition A. Picard, Paris, 1879.
- Étude sur la topographie de la ville d'Acre au XIIIe siècle, In-8°, 33 p., plans, Extrait des Mémoires de la Société nationale des antiquaires de France. T. XXXIX, Édition impr. de G. Daupeley, Nogent-le-Rotrou, 1879.
- Carte de la Montagne des Ansariès et du Pachalik d'Alep, 1 flle en noir, bleu et bistre : 580 x 665, Vers 1880, Édition Erhard, Paris, 1880.
- Note sur les territoires possédés par les Francs à l'est du lac de Tibériade, de la mer Morte et du Jourdain, : In-8°, 9 p., carte, Extrait des Mémoires de la Société nationale des antiquaires de France. T. XLI, Édition impr. de Daupeley-Gouverneur, Nogent-le-Rotrou, 1881.
- Les colonies franques de Syrie aux XIIe et XIIIe siècles, 1 vol. (VI-IV-537 p.), 1883, Édition A. Picard, Paris.
- Notice sur la carte de Syrie, In-8°, 27 p., 1885, Édition Hachette, Paris.
- Recherches géographiques et historiques sur la domination des latins en Orient, accompagnées de textes inédits ou peu connus du XIIe au XIVe siècle, 1 vol. (75 p.), Imprimerie de Lahure, Paris, 1877 [s.n.].
- Notice sur la vie et les travaux de M. F. de Saulcy, In-8°, 16 p., Extrait du Bulletin de la Société des antiquaires de France, Édition impr. de Daupeley-Gouverneur, Nogent-le-Rotrou, 1881.
- Notice sur la Cavea de Roob ou Scheriat-el-Mandour, In-8°, 11 p., Extrait des Mémoires de la Société nationale des antiquaires de France. T. XLVI, Édition impr. de Daupeley-Gouverneur, Nogent-le-Rotrou, 1886.
- L'Ordre du Temple en Syrie et à Chypre : les Templiers en Terre sainte, In-8°, 32 p., Extrait de la Revue de Champagne et de Brie, Édition L Frémont, Arcis-sur-Aube, 1888.
- Supplément à l'étude sur la topographie de la ville d'Acre au XIIIe siècle, In-8°, 18 p., planche, Extrait des Mémoires de la Société nationale des antiquaires de France. T. XLIX, Édition Nogent-le-Rotrou, Impr. de Daupeley-Gouverneur, 1889.
- Étude sur le procès des Templiers, In-8°, 22 p., Extrait de la Revue de Champagne et de Brie, Édition Arcis-sur-Aube, impr. de L. Frémont, 1891.
- Les Seigneurs de Barut. Les Seigneurs de Mont-Réal et la terre d'outre le Jourdain..., In-8°, 73 p., Extrait de la Revue de l'Orient latin. T. IV, 1896. No. 1, Édition Ernest Leroux, Paris, 1896.
- Résumé chronologique de l'histoire des princes d'Antioche..., In-8°, 87 p., Extrait de la Revue de l'Orient latin. T. IV, 1896, nos 2-3, Édition Ernest Leroux, Paris, 1896.
- Les grandes écoles syriennes du IVe au XIIe siècle, 35 p., Édition Ernest Leroux, Paris, 1898.
- Notice nécrologique de M. Victor Guérin, par E. Rey, ... (lue à la séance du 1^{er} février 1893), In-8°, 4 p., Extrait des Mémoires de la Société nationale des antiquaires de France et du Bulletin de la Société nationale des antiquaires de France, Édition Nogent-le-Rotrou, Impr. de Daupeley-Gouverneur, 1893.
- Les Seigneurs de Giblet..., In-8°, 25 p., Extrait de la Revue de l'Orient latin. T. III, Édition Ernest Leroux, Paris, 1895.
- Les Dignitaires de la principauté d'Antioche, grands officiers et patriarches (XI^{e} – XIII^{e} siècle)..., In-8°, 44 p., Extrait de la Revue de l'Orient latin, T. VIII, Édition Ernest Leroux, Paris, 1901.

== Sources ==
- Bordeaux, Henry (1926). Voyageurs d'Orient, des Pèlerins aux Méharistes de Palmyre (in French). Vol. 1. Paris: Plon.
