= Israeli occupation of the West Bank =

Military occupation by Israel since 1967

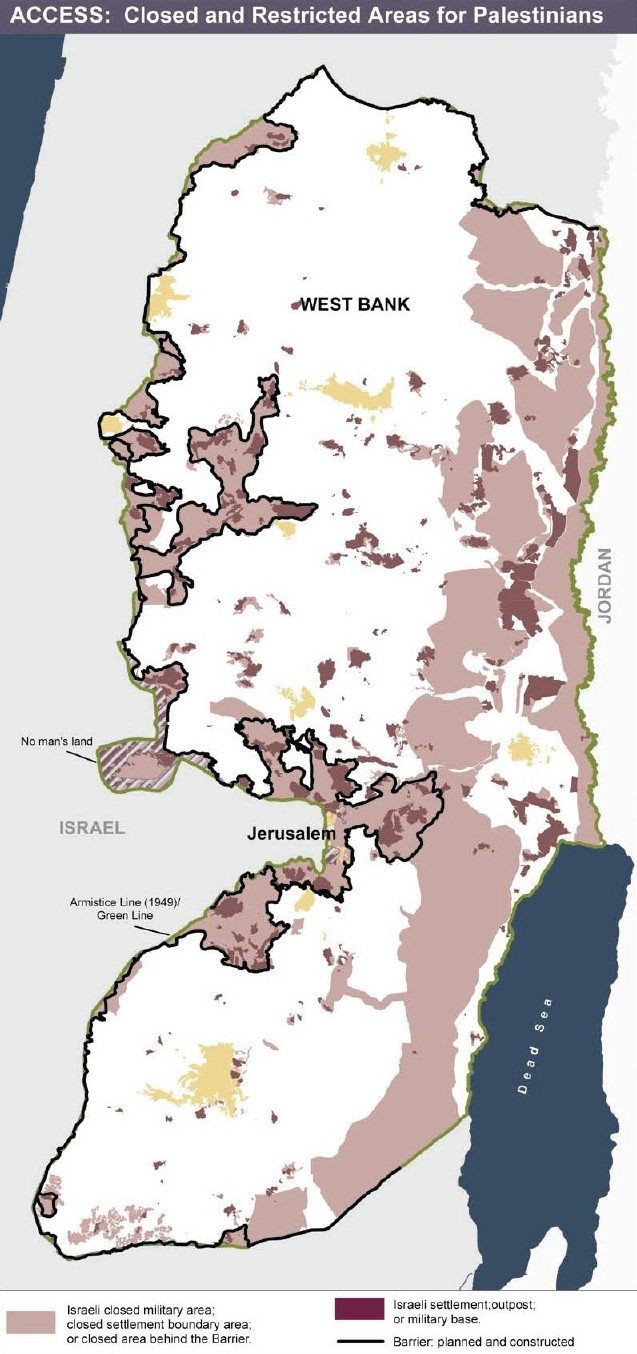
Map of West Bank settlements and closures in January 2006: Palestinian urban centers Closed military areas or settlement boundary areas or areas isolated by the Israeli West Bank barrier Settlements, outposts or military bases Route of the Barrier

The West Bank, including East Jerusalem, has been under military occupation by Israel since 7 June 1967, when Israeli forces captured the territory, then occupied by Jordan, during the Six-Day War. (Note: On 7 June 1967, Israel issued "Proclamation Regarding Law and Administration (The West Bank Area) (No. 2)—1967" which established the military government in the West Bank and granted the commander of the area full legislative, executive, and judicial power. The proclamation kept in force local law that existed on 7 June 1967, except where contradicted by any new proclamation or military order (Weill 2007, p. 401; Weill 2014, p. 19)) The West Bank is part of the state of Palestine, and its status as a militarily occupied territory has been affirmed by the International Court of Justice (ICJ) and, with the exception of East Jerusalem, by the Israeli Supreme Court. The West Bank, excepting East Jerusalem, is administered by the Israeli Civil Administration, a branch of the Israeli Ministry of Defense. (Note: Jordan claimed it had a provisional sovereignty over the West Bank, a claim revoked in 1988 when it accepted the Palestinian National Council's declaration of statehood in that year. Israel did not accept this passage of a claim to sovereignty, nor asserted its counterclaim, holding that the Palestinian claim of sovereignty is incompatible with the fact that Israel is, in law, a belligerent occupant of the territory. Secondly it regards the West Bank as a disputed territory on the technical argument that the Fourth Geneva Convention's stipulations do not apply since, in its view, the legal status of the territory is sui generis and not covered by international law, a position rejected by the International Court of Justice (ICJ).) Considered to be a classic example of an "intractable conflict", (Note: "The Israeli-Palestinian conflict is as prototypical case of a conflict which meets the criteria describing an intractable conflict: it is prolonged, irreconcilable, violent and perceived as having zero-game nature and total." (Shaked 2016, p. 134)) Israel's occupation is now the longest in modern history. (Note: "Decisions of the Israeli Supreme Court have held that the Israeli occupation of the territories has endured far longer than any occupation contemplated by the drafters of the rules of international law." (Lazar 1990, p. 7)) Though its occupation is illegal, (Note: The International Court of Justice has rejected the Israeli view that the territory is not occupied and ruled that Israel's "continued presence in the Occupied Palestinian Territory is unlawful" (International Court of Justice 2024).) Israel has cited several reasons for retaining the West Bank within its ambit: historic rights stemming from the Balfour Declaration; security grounds, both internal and external; and the area's symbolic value for Jews.

Israel has controversially, and in contravention of international law, established numerous Jewish settlements throughout the West Bank. The United Nations Security Council has repeatedly affirmed that settlements in that territory are a "flagrant violation of international law", most recently in 2016 with United Nations Security Council Resolution 2334. The ICJ has also found that the establishment of Israeli settlements is illegal under international law. The creation and ongoing expansion of the settlements have led to Israel's policies being criticized as an example of settler colonialism. (Note: The Hebrew word for Jewish settlement across the Green Line is hitnakhalut and for "settlers", mitnakhalim implying an inheritance (nakhal), whereas the contemporary Palestinian Arabic term for them, mustawtinin, etymologically suggests those who have taken root, or indigenized natives, a term that historically has not borne negative connotations. "There was nothing derogatory or prejudicial in the use of the term al-mustawtinin, nor did it apply to Jews alone. It could refer equally to any Muslim who had recently taken up residence in Jerusalem but who had been born elsewhere within the Empire". Down to 1948, Palestinians called Zionist settlements (but not traditional Jewish communities such as those in Hebron, Tiberias and Jerusalem whose residents were often called Yahud awlad Arab, "Arab Jews/Jews who are the sons of Arabs") kubaniya (companies) or musta'amara/mustawtana only in the written language, and settlers khawaja (master, foreigner), musta'amara (colony, implying invasion and musta'amarin (colonizers) entered colloquial usage after 1948. From 1967 to 1993, al-mustawtin ("one who has turned the land into his homeland") and al mustawtana came to the fore to denote, respectively, settlers and settlements in the West Bank and Gaza.)

Israel has been accused of major violations of international human rights law, including collective punishment, in its administration of the occupied Palestinian territories. (Note: "At least five categories of major violations of international human rights law and humanitarian law characterize the occupation: unlawful killings; forced displacement; abusive detention; the closure of the Gaza Strip and other unjustified restrictions on movement; and the development of settlements, along with the accompanying discriminatory policies that disadvantage Palestinians" (HRW 2017a).) Israeli settlers and civilians living or traveling through the West Bank are subject to Israeli law, and are represented in the Knesset; in contrast, Palestinian civilians, mostly confined to scattered enclaves, are subject to martial law and are not permitted to vote in Israel's national elections. (Note: While Arab citizens of Israel, most of whom are ethnically Palestinian, can vote in Israeli national elections and live under civilian, not military, rule, very few live in the West Bank settlements, whose funding and purpose is directed at promoting Jewish residency.) This two-tiered system has caused Israel to be accused of committing apartheid, a charge that Israel rejects entirely. (Note: Julie Peteet also argues that there is an Israeli narrative of exceptionalism which works to "exempt" it from such comparisons (Peteet 2016, p. 249).) Israel's vast military superiority, with a modern army and air force, compared to the Palestinian use of guerrilla tactics, has led to accusations of war crimes on both sides, with Israel being accused of disproportionality and the Palestinians accused of indiscriminate attacks.

The occupation also has numerous critics within Israel itself, with some Israeli conscripts refusing to serve due to their objections to the occupation. The legal status of the occupation itself, and not just the actions taken as a part of it, have been increasingly scrutinized by the international community and by scholars in the field of international law, with most finding that regardless of whether the occupation had been legal when it began, it has become illegal over time. (Note: "even if the occupation was not illegal ab initio, it has been rendered illegal over time for being in violation of the aforementioned jus cogens norms." (Imseis 2023, pp. 197, 215))

== The West Bank in 1967 ==
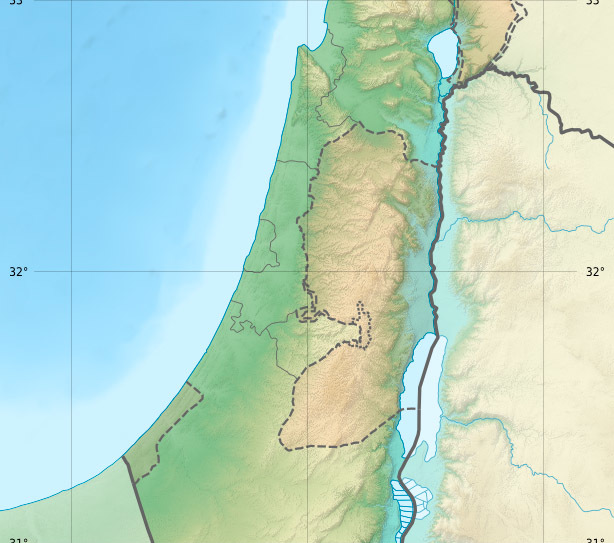
Relief map of the West Bank

Israel's economy was 10 times larger than the West Bank's on the eve of the occupation, but had experienced two years of recession. The West Bank's population stood between 585,500 and 803,600 and, while under Jordanian rule, accounted for 40% of Jordan's GNP, with an annual growth rate of 6–8%. Ownership of land was generally collective, and the 19th century Ottoman land code prevailed, which classified land as either – waqf, mülk, miri, matruke, and mawat – the last three being formally state land, though Jordan never considered these last three as state property, and only a very small proportion of the West Bank was registered as such under Jordanian rule.

Education was (and remains (Note: "Fifty-two percent of all Palestinians are under the age of 30, and 40 percent of the 18–24 year-old group enroll in tertiary education. This is one of the highest enrollment rates in the region and reflects as much the societal importance of a high educational degree as it does weak employment opportunities." (Shinn 2012, p. 611))) a high priority, The enrollment rate averaged an annual increase of 7% over the prior decade, and by 1966, Palestinian youth had the highest enrollment rate of all Arab countries. Palestinians in the West Bank had a favourable educational basis compared to Israeli Arabs and Jordanian youth, due to the preexisting provisions of the Jordanian school system which provided 12 years of free and compulsory education, with some 44.6% of West Bank teenagers in the 15–17 age group participating in some form of secondary schooling.

=== Conquest ===
In 1956, the Israeli leader David Ben-Gurion stated that: "Jordan has no right to exist. [...] The territory to the West of the Jordan should be made an autonomous region of Israel". There had been a very strong opposition to any "Balkanization" or division of Palestine, especially among American Zionists, in the mid-late thirties, since it would have made a prospective homeland, thus truncated, suicidally small. It was in this context that Ben-Gurion argued forcefully for accepting partition agreements as temporary measures, steps on the way to an incremental incorporation of all of Palestine into a Jewish state. (Note: "A partial Jewish state is not the end, but only the beginning. The establishment of such a Jewish State will serve as a means in our historical efforts to redeem the country in its entirety ... We will expel the Arabs and take their places... with the force at our disposal." (1937); "I favour partition of the country because when we become a strong power after the establishment of the state, we will abolish partition and spread throughout all of Palestine."(1938) (Slater 1994, p. 182))

According to Israeli historian Adam Raz, as early as 1961, the IDF had drawn up meticulous plans for the conquest and retention of not only the West Bank, but also the Sinai Peninsula and Gaza Strip from Egypt, and the Golan Heights from Syria. In August 1963, within the framework of "expected directions of expansion", southern Lebanon up to the Litani River was also included. Though international pressure might foreseeably force Israel to evacuate these conquered lands, contingency plans also envisaged political circumstances whose development would enable Israel to maintain control of these occupied territory indefinitely. The model for controlling Palestinians in the West Bank, were this to eventuate, was to be modeled on the Israeli governance of their Palestinian communities under a strict regime of permits.

Before the Six-Day War, there had been an unwritten agreement between Israel and the Jordanian government to uphold the neutrality of the border between the two countries along the Green Line. According to King Hussein, after Israel retaliated against Syrian-backed guerrilla infiltrations and sabotage by conducting on 13 November 1966 an assault on Samu in the West Bank, an area administered by Jordan, that tacit accord was broken. (Note: "Events leading up to the Six-Day War show that the order established in 1957 had broken down long before Nasser decided to remilitarize the Sinai Peninsula. The greater the military advantage in relation to the Arab armies grew and the closer Israel came to developing a nuclear weapon, the larger and more extensive the IDF 'punitive operations' became. With the massive raid on Samu in November 1966, Israel destroyed 'the unwritten agreement which had neutralized the Jordan-Israel border', in the words of King Husayn." (Popp 2006, p. 308)) After Israel attacked Egypt at 8 a.m. on 5 June 1967, Jordan responded by shelling Israeli targets in West Jerusalem, and settlements along the border and then, after ignoring an Israeli warning, by attacking Israeli airfields in Ramat David and Kfar Syrkin, but also Netanya. In response, the Israeli army in a swift campaign took possession of East Jerusalem and, after news that King Hussein had ordered his forces to withdraw across the Jordan, took the entire West Bank by noon on 8 June. (Note: "Dayan ordered his troops to dig in on the slopes east of Jerusalem. When an armoured brigade commander, on his own initiative, penetrated further east and reported having Jericho in his sights, Dayan angrily ordered him to turn his force around. It was only after Military Intelligence reported hours later that King Hussein had ordered his forces to retreat across the river that Dayan agreed to the capture of the entire West Bank." (Shlaim 2012, p. 46))

Israel expelled many people from areas it had conquered, beginning with an estimated 12,000 people who on the very first day were rounded up in the villages of Imwas, Yalo and Bayt Nuba in the Latrun Salient and ordered by the Israeli military into exile eastwards. All three villages were then destroyed, and within two years the area was planned as a recreational area now called Canada Park. Tens of thousands of Palestinians fled to Jordan from the refugee camps of Aqabat Jaber and Ein as-Sultan after Israel bombed the camps. The overall numbers of Palestinians displaced by that war is generally estimated to have been around 280,000–325,000, of which it has been calculated that some 120–170,000 were two-time refugees, having been displaced earlier during the 1948 war. The number who left the West Bank as a consequence of the war ranges from 100,000 to 400,000, of which from 50,000 to 200,000 lived in the Jordan Valley.

=== Military-civil administration ===
During the 1967 war, Israel appointed a Military Governor to rule the West Bank, with a remit to retain Jordanian law except where these conflicted with Israel's rights as belligerent occupying power. The Israeli administration of Palestinian territories became in time "the longest – and, accordingly, the most entrenched and institutionalized – belligerent occupation in modern history", issuing from 1967 to 2014 over 1,680 military orders regarding the West Bank. The third military order, issued two days after the onset of the occupation, specified that military courts were to apply the provisions of the Fourth Geneva Convention regarding the protection of civilians in a war zone: within 4 months this stipulation was erased from the order. Jordan maintains that some of the laws ostensibly retained from its code, stemming from the Mandatory Defence (Emergency) Regulations of 1945, had in fact been abolished, and were invalid as they conflicted with the Fourth Geneva Convention of 1949. The Israeli Military Governorate was dissolved in 1981, and in its place the Israeli military established the Israeli Civil Administration. The military order establishing the Israeli Civil Administration, military order 947, specified that "the Civil Administration shall administer civilian affairs ... with regard to the welfare and benefit of the population." Meron Benvenisti argues that this transition marked the transformation of the occupation from a temporary into a permanent system.

The military closely supervised elections in local clubs, cooperatives, or charitable organizations. West Bank lawyers were banned on security grounds from organizing a bar association. Palestinians were denied direct political representation after 1976, and instead, village leagues (rawabit al-qura) were introduced, and furnished by Israel with arms and militias. These leagues had a short life: their appointees were considered to be quislings by General Binyamin Ben-Eliezer and collaborationists by the local population, and to have been recruited from people who were lazy or had criminal backgrounds. With the Oslo Accords, Israel negotiated with the Palestine Liberation Organization a provisory agreement which left the latter some autonomy in Area A, mixed regulation of Area B, and total Israeli administration of the largest zone, Area C. Israel retains a right to operate militarily in all three zones, but security issues have a bilateral dimension that had led a number of critics to argue that effectively the Palestinian National Authority has become Israel's subcontractor in the occupation. According to an analysis by the Israeli think tank Molad in 2017, Israel deploys 50–75% of its active IDF forces in the West Bank, while only one-third deals with Arab states, Iran, Hezbollah, Hamas and other perceived external threats. 80% of the former defend settlements, while 20% handle any behavior that Israel considers a security threat, including terrorism.

=== Israeli security concerns ===
A concern for security in Israel has been said to "vastly exceed the norm for other Western countries". Israel's military-industrial sector, which by the early 1980s employed a quarter of all industrial workers with 28% of GNP devoted to defense expenditures, became the fastest growing sector of the economy after 1967. (Note: Israel's military-industrial sector, which by the early 1980s employed a quarter of all industrial workers with 28% of GNP devoted to defense expenditures, became the fastest growing sector of the economy after 1967 (Mintz 1983, pp. 623, 628).) It came to extend its activities beyond issues of defense, spilling over into the administration and settlement of the occupied territories. (Note: "Israel's military-industrial complex undoubtedly has numerous extensions into clearly civilian areas, with the risk of 'overflow' (as President Eisenhower warned the American people) beyond the boundaries of defense interests alone...Israel's defense system... carries out settlement and administrative activities in the Administered Territories." (Mintz 1983, p. 633))

The occupation has, according to some Israeli researchers, produced an ethos of conflict of which perceived security concerns, at times perplexing to outsiders, (Note: "It is often stated that Israel's concern with security trumps every other consideration. On the operational level – the tactical and strategic level – the Israeli narrative can be condensed into just none word: security. It trumps every other consideration... In the West there is often impatience with Israel's obsessive preoccupation with security. Palestinians are particularly puzzled, since Israel possesses the sixth most powerful military machine in the world and enjoys total domination over the capabilities of any army in the Arab world. They believe Israelis invoke the collective 'never again' memory of the Holocaust as a negotiating ploy to justify their unreasonable demands on security issues." (O'Malley 2015, pp. 39–40)) are a central feature. Although security is a fundamental Israeli preoccupation, the state has never formalized an official national security policy or doctrine. Before June 1967, the Israeli cabinet did not regard the West Bank as having a "vital security value". Before the war ended, the IDF's research department under Shlomo Gazit drew up a proposal to pull back from the West Bank and Gaza almost completely in exchange for a peace treaty, since, they concluded, there was no need for retaining any territory on security grounds. The document was ignored. (Note: The Palestinian lawyer and notable Aziz Shehadah, an opponent of Jordanian rule, proposed a peace agreement with Israel in exchange for a Palestinian state at this time (Gorenberg 2007, p. 39).) It was in the wake of the conquest that secure, defensible borders became a keynote of Israel's foreign policy.

Four schools of thought came to dominate the question of the acquired territories. Two were closely linked to strategic questions of security. The territorialist approach, associated with Yigal Allon's Allon Plan (1967–1970), would have annexed all of the West Bank south of Jerusalem and the lowland border along the Jordan River, and excluded areas closer to the pre-1967 border, which had a high density of Palestinians. The functionalist view, associated with Moshe Dayan and later Simon Peres, foresaw setting up five army bases along the Jordan ridges, which also left the Palestinians in between with a degree of autonomy, though constrained to accept the presence of Israelis among them. (Note: "Dayan had submitted his own secret plan. Predictably, it was the photo negative of Allon's. The mountain ridge – not the lowlands along the Jordan – was the strategic land Israel needed, Dayan asserted." (Gorenberg 2007, pp. 81–83)) (Note: He suggested to the Palestinian poet Fadwa Tuqan that it would be like a bedouin kidnapping an unwilling girl in order to force marriage on her: "You Palestinians, as a nation, don't want us today, but we'll change your attitude by forcing our presence on you." (Gorenberg 2007, pp. 82–83)) From 1968 to 1977 Labor governments facilitated a number of settlements designed to form a bulwark against the threat of future mass tank assaults from Jordan and Iraq.

The third approach, associated with Menachem Begin and the Likud party, is annexationist, and with the ascendency of Likud, the biblical resonance of West Bank territory outweighed questions of security significance in driving an expansion of settlements, though both Likud and Gush Emunim came to oppose Palestinian independence on security grounds and treated West Bank Palestinians as either potential enemies or security threats, by arguing that national autonomy would develop into a basis for PLO aggression. The fourth position, associated with Abba Eban, Pinhas Sapir and Yehoshafat Harkabi is reconciliationist, being opposed to the idea of "Fortress Israel". Its proponents do not generally consider retention of the West Bank indispensable for guaranteeing Israel's security interests, with Harkabi, a former head of military intelligence, advocating withdrawal to the 1967 borders in exchange for a negotiated settlement with the PLO.

The West Bank was considered a bargaining chip in securing a broad peace treaty with Arab nations. In time, especially after the Sinai withdrawal, and suggestions the Golan Heights were also negotiable, the idea of retaining territory for strategic interests dwindled in importance, as a military anachronism in an age of missile warfare. (Note: "According to the new prevalent thinking, strategic depth and defensible borders, articles of faith in the past- are a strategic anachronism." (Inbar 2007, p. 92)) The military arguments for retaining ground were supplanted by political considerations, that Arab acquiescence in agreed on borders is of greater importance, and that settlements, formerly placed along possible invasion routes, were no longer functional for security, if they were an obstacle to peace. The Oslo Accords, moreover, had set in place a Palestinian security apparatus that, as Yitzhak Rabin acknowledged, worked with Israel to safeguard Israel's security interests.

According to analysts who support Israeli settlements, the presence of hostile, armed forces on the high ground of the West Bank would pose a security risk to the narrow Israeli land between the West Bank and the Mediterranean coast, which contains some of the country's biggest strategic assets, including Ben Gurion airport, the largest electric power station, and highly populated cities. Over half of the Israeli public believes settlements reinforce Israel's security. In recent years, numerous top defense experts disagree, dismissing the idea as a myth or outdated illusion. (Note: "Even if the idea that the settlements contribute to security had some validity in the past, today it has none. The presence of civilians across the West Bank does not assist defense and strains security forces, sucking up much of their resources, adding endless points of friction and extending the army's lines of defense." (Harel 2017)) (Note: "In Israeli public opinion, the settlements in the West Bank are often portrayed as a first line of defense that enables the residents of Tel Aviv and its environs to breathe easy. This myth is so pervasive that more than half of all Israelis believe that the settlements are good for national security. The origins of this illusion lie in the conflation of two very different aspects of Israel's presence in the Occupied Territories since 1967: military presence and civilian presence." (Gordis & Levi 2017, p. 4)) 106 retired Israeli generals, such as Eyal Ben-Reuven, Moshe Kaplinsky and Gadi Shamni, and Shin Bet heads, such as Yuval Diskin, have publicly opposed Benjamin Netanyahu's claim that an independent state of Palestine would be a security threat, arguing variously that holding millions of Palestinians under occupation on ostensible security-related grounds, rather than pursuing an overall peace plan with Arab countries, endangers Israel's future.

== Territory ==
Israel extended its jurisdiction over East Jerusalem on 28 June 1967, suggesting internally it was annexed while maintaining abroad that it was simply an administrative move to provide services to residents. The move was deemed "null and void" by the United Nations Security Council. The elected Arab council was disbanded, and a number of services provided by Palestinian companies were transferred to their Israeli competitors. The population ratio for this united Jerusalem was set ideally as 76% Jewish and 24% Arab, and Jewish Israeli settlers were given a 5-year tax exemption, not applied to Palestinian Jerusalemites, who were placed in a high income tax bracket, and paid for 26% of municipal services while receiving 5% of the benefits. The Palestinian areas were encircled by Jewish new town developments which effectively closed them off from expansion, and services to the latter were kept low so that after decades, basic infrastructure was left in neglect, with shortages of schools, inadequate sewage and garbage disposal. By 2017, 370,000 lived in the overcrowded Arab areas, living under severe restrictions on their daily movement and commerce. One 2012 report stated that the effect of Israeli policies was that, amidst flourishing modern Jewish settlements, the Arab sector had been allowed to decay into a slum where criminals, many of them collaborators, thrived. In 2018 legislative measures were announced to strip a further 12,000 Palestinians of their right to live in East Jerusalem.

Israel's policies regarding the use of land in the rest of the West Bank display three interlocking aspects, all designed around a project of Judaization of what was Palestinian territory. These policies consist of (a) planning for land use, (b) expropriations of land, and (c) the construction of settlements.

=== Area C ===
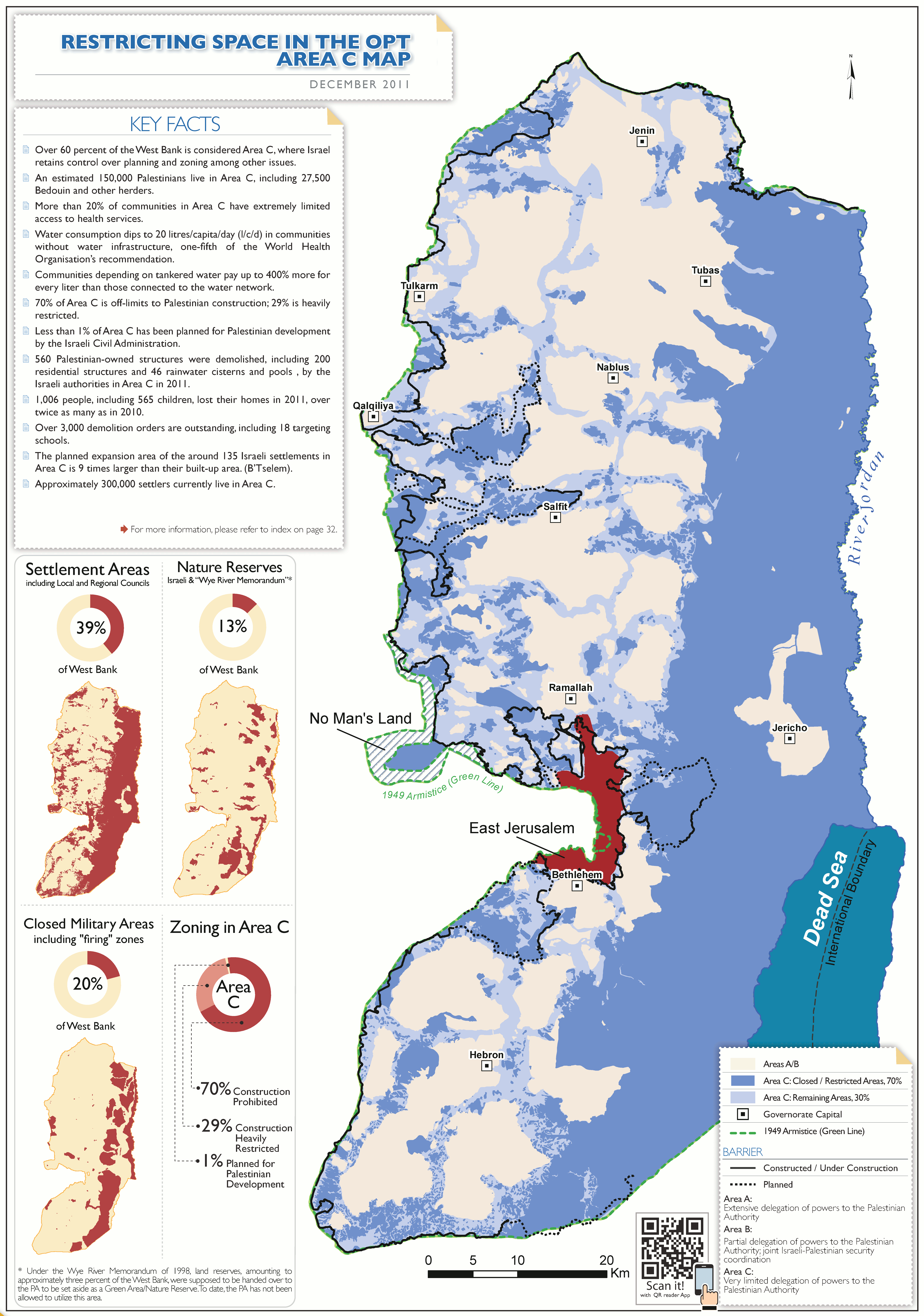
Area C East Jerusalem

The "Letters of Mutual Recognition" accompanying the "Israel-PLO Declaration of Principles on Interim Self-Government Arrangements" (the DOP), signed in Washington on 13 September 1993, provided for a transitional period not exceeding five years of Palestinian interim self-government in the Gaza Strip and the West Bank. Major critics of these arrangements, headed by Raja Shehadeh, argue that the PLO had scarce interest or competence in the legal implications of what it was signing. (Note: "On the Palestinian side there seems to be an apparent lack of interest in law, legal confusion and very serious lacunae in the laws passed after the agreements with Israel were concluded." (Imseis 2000, p. 475))

These Oslo Accords ceded nominal control of a small amount of the West Bank to a Palestinian authority, with a provisory division of the land, excluding East Jerusalem, into 3 areas: Area A (18% of territory, 55% of population), Area B (20% of territory, 41% of the population), and Area C (62% of territory, 5.8% of population). Israel never finalized the undertaking with regard to Area C to transfer zoning and planning from the Israeli to the Palestinian authorities within five years and all administrative functions continued to remain in its hands. Tactically, the Accord lessened Israel's problem with large-scale demonstrations since the areas of ostensible PA control were fragmented into 165 islands containing 90% of the Palestinian population, all surrounded by the spatially contiguous 60% of the West Bank where the PA was forbidden to venture. (Note: In Ariel Handel's analysis, the 124 "legal" settlements, though forming only 2% of the West Bank's land surface have municipal jurisdictions which extend over 42% of the territory, and form one single gated community within which the Palestinian towns and villages become "islands". For example, the Hebron Governorate has a Palestinian population of 684,247 (2013), but 7.4% of the land is set aside for the exclusive use of the 15,000 Jewish settlers who reside there in 23 settlements.) Israel then reasserted in 2000 a right to enter, according to "operational needs", Area A where most West Bank Palestinians live and which is formally under PA administration, meaning they still effectively control all the West Bank including areas under nominal PA authority.

According to the United Nations special rapporteur on Human Rights in the Palestinian Territories, Michael Lynk, the policies applied by Israel indicate an intention to annex totally Area C, which has 86% of the nature reserves, 91% of the forests, 48% of the wells and 37% of the springs in the West Bank.

== Early economic impact of occupation ==
The early occupation set severe limits on public investment and comprehensive development programmes in the territories. British and Arab commercial banks operating in the West Bank were closed down soon after Israel assumed power there. Bank Leumi then opened nine branches, without successfully replacing the earlier system. Farmers could get loans, but Palestinian businessmen avoided taking out loans from them since they charged 9% compared to 5% interest in Jordan. Land confiscations led to rural labour seeking employment, even if mainly menial, in Israel, causing a labour scarcity in the West Bank, and their remittances were the major factor in Palestinian economic growth during the 1969–73 boom years.

The Israeli licensing system stipulated no industrial plant could be built without obtaining a prior Israeli permit, which was often tied to security concerns. Entrepreneurs were denied a permit for a cement factory in Hebron, melon production was forbidden, imports of grapes and dates banned to protect Israeli farmers, and limits were set to how many cucumbers and tomatoes could be produced. Israeli milk producers exerted pressure on the Ministry for Industry and Trade to stop the establishment of a competitive dairy in Ramallah. Ian Lustick states that Israel "virtually prevented" Palestinian investment in local industry and agriculture. Two decades later, 90% of West Bank imports came from Israel, with consumers paying more than they would for comparable products had they been able to exercise commercial autonomy.

=== Land seizure mechanisms ===
In 1968, a military order stopped attempts by Palestinians to register their land, while permitting Israel to register areas as state land with its own Custodian of Enemy Property. Whereas Ottoman and British Mandatory Authorities had used property-tax books to collect taxes from villages, Israel ignored these as evidence of ownership, demanding instead that proof be given that the land was under cultivation, while army seizures often prevented villagers from continuing to work their fields. From 1967 to 1983, Israel expropriated over 52% of the West Bank, most of its prime agricultural land, and, by the eve of the 1993 Oslo Accords, these confiscations had encompassed over three-quarters of the territory. The mechanisms by which Israel seizes or expropriates West Bank land were set forth in a detailed work by B'Tselem in 2002. (Note: Five mechanisms have been identified: (a) Seizure for Military Needs. (b) Recourse to the Ottoman Law Code of 1858. (c) Absentee Property. (d) Expropriation for Public Needs and (e) Acquisition of Land on the Free Market (Lein & Weizman 2002, pp. 37–63).) Many practices outlined there were confirmed in the official Israeli Sasson Report of 2005, which focused on government subsidies and support for the creation of illegal Israeli outposts in knowing contravention of Israel's own laws. (Note: "Sasson implicated the full range of authorities –military and civilian- in breaking the law and pointed to the Civil Administration of the OPT as the hub of illegality." (Shafir 2017, pp. 74–75))

Under international law, a military may take temporary possession of occupied land, but not expropriate it. From 1957 to 1976 the IDF repeatedly requisitioned private Palestinian properties on the grounds of military necessity, only to turn them over for Jewish settlements, such as Matitiyahu, Neve Tzuf, Rimonim, Bet El, Kokhav Hashahar, Alon Shvut, El'azar, Efrat, Har Gilo, Migdal Oz, Gittit, Yitav and Qiryat Arba. This practice, after Palestinians appealed, was blocked by the High Court in the case of Elon Moreh (1979). Thereafter, the Ottoman Land Law of 1858, which enabled the sovereign to seize certain types of land, though much private land had not been registered to avoid taxes or military service with the Ottomans, was reactivated. Thirdly, land temporally abandoned during the 1967 war deemed absentee property came under trusteeship, but since Israel rarely allows refugees to return, instances where land is restored to its rightful owners are few and far between. If a claim is made, but the Custodian has sold it to a settler group in the meantime, the sale cannot be nullified even if invalid. Fourthly, land expropriated for public need under Jordanian law required notification, time for appeal, and royal approval. Israel modified this by delegating the power to regional military commanders, and by abolishing the requirement to publish the intention to expropriate in an official gazette. Appeals were no longer dealt with in local courts but by the military court system. Lastly, land sales were subject to severe restrictions, except for purchases by the Jewish National Fund. Since Palestinians regard the sale of their land to Jews as treasonable, the law was altered to enable Jewish buyers to withhold registration of property acquired from Palestinians for 15 years. Many fraudulent practices in this regard flourished until they were formally stopped by law in 1985.

One estimate put the amount of unalienable Islamic property dedicated to pious ends confiscated by Israel at over 600,000 dunams.

== Settlement ==
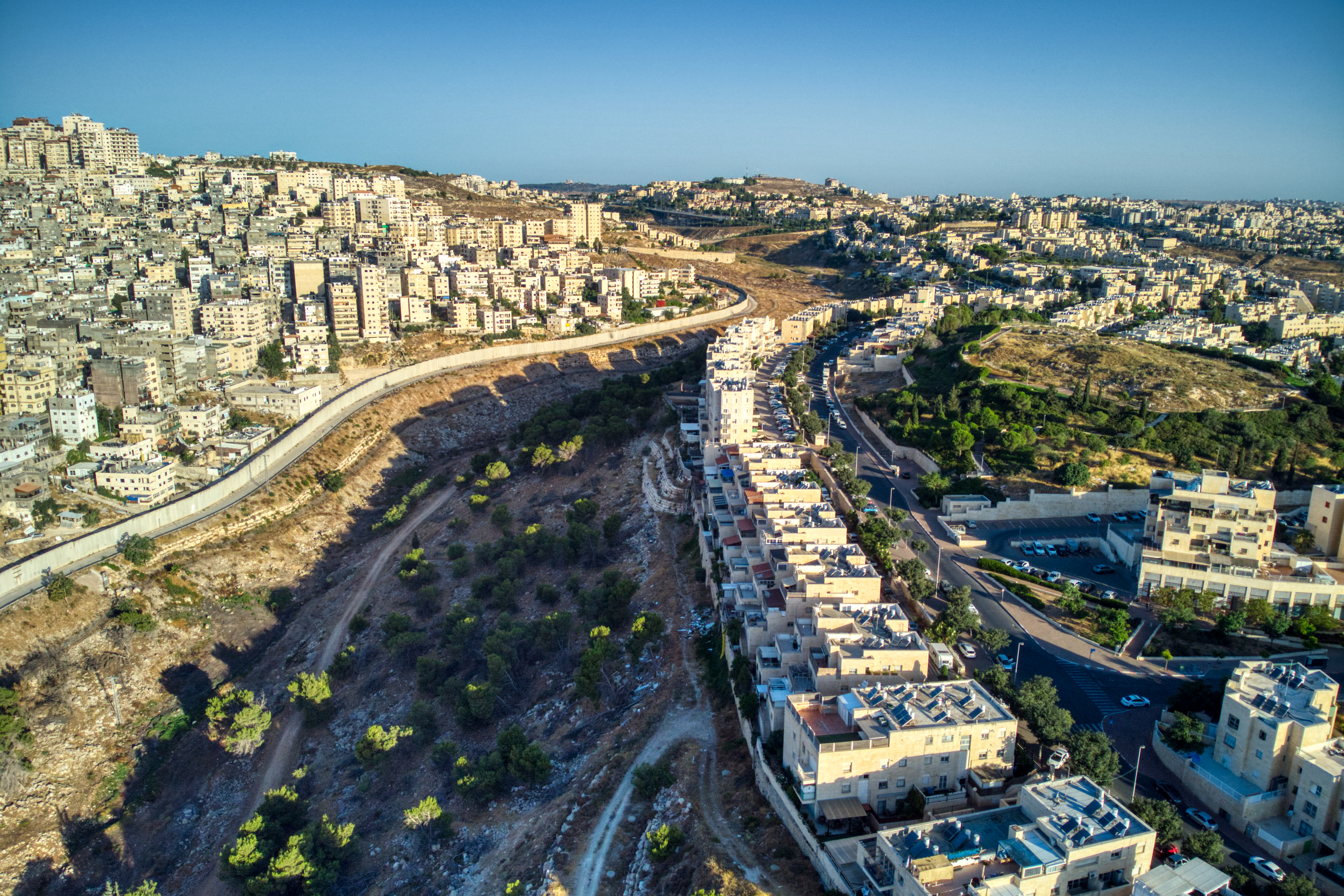
On the left, the Shu'fat Palestinian refugee camp, bordered by the Israeli West Bank wall, facing the Israeli settlement of Pisgat Ze'ev. East Jerusalem, 2023

Ariel Sharon viewed the primary function of settling the West Bank as one of precluding the possibility of the formation of a Palestinian state, and his aim in promoting the 1982 invasion of Lebanon was to secure perpetual control of the former. As of 2017, excluding East Jerusalem, 382,916 Israelis have settled in the West Bank, and 40% (approximately 170,000 in 106 other settlements) live outside the major settlement blocs, where 214,000 reside.

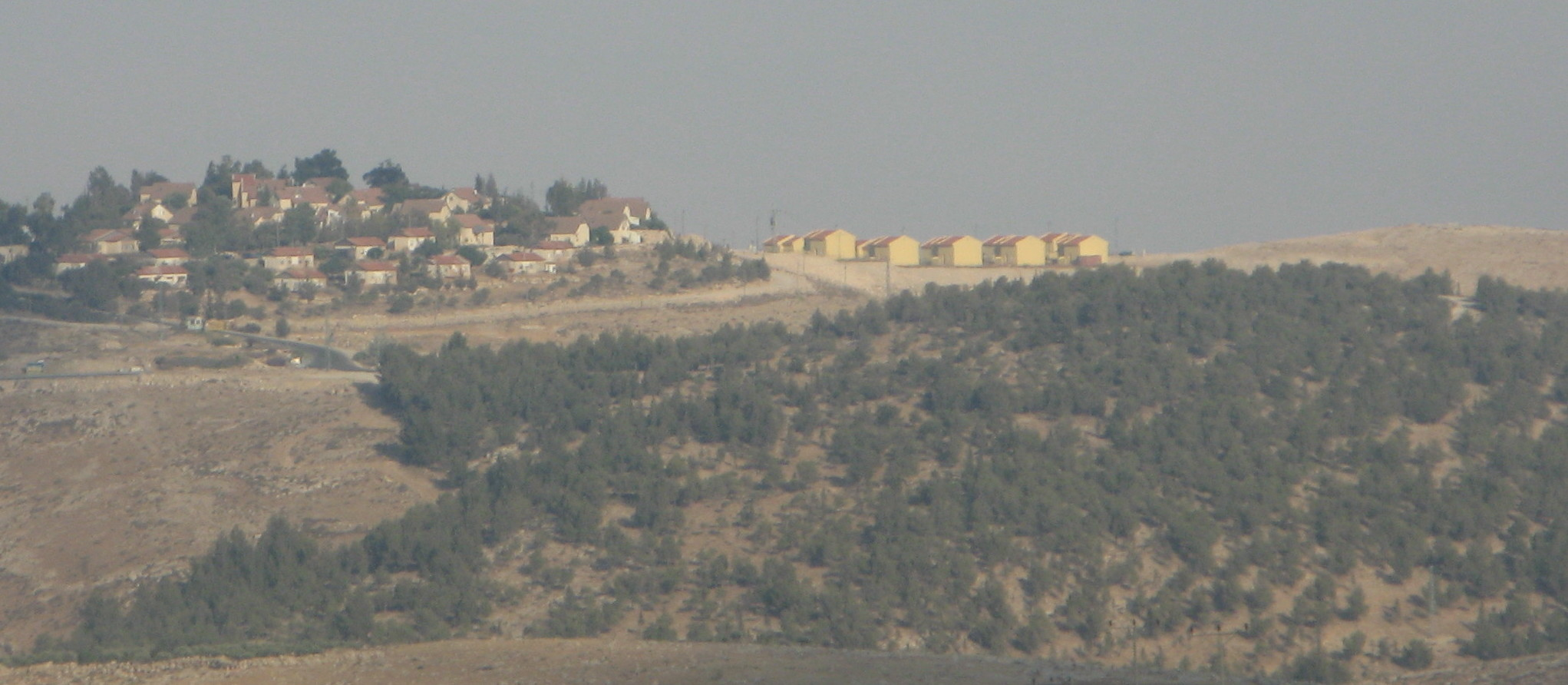
Israeli settlement of Carmel, Har Hebron

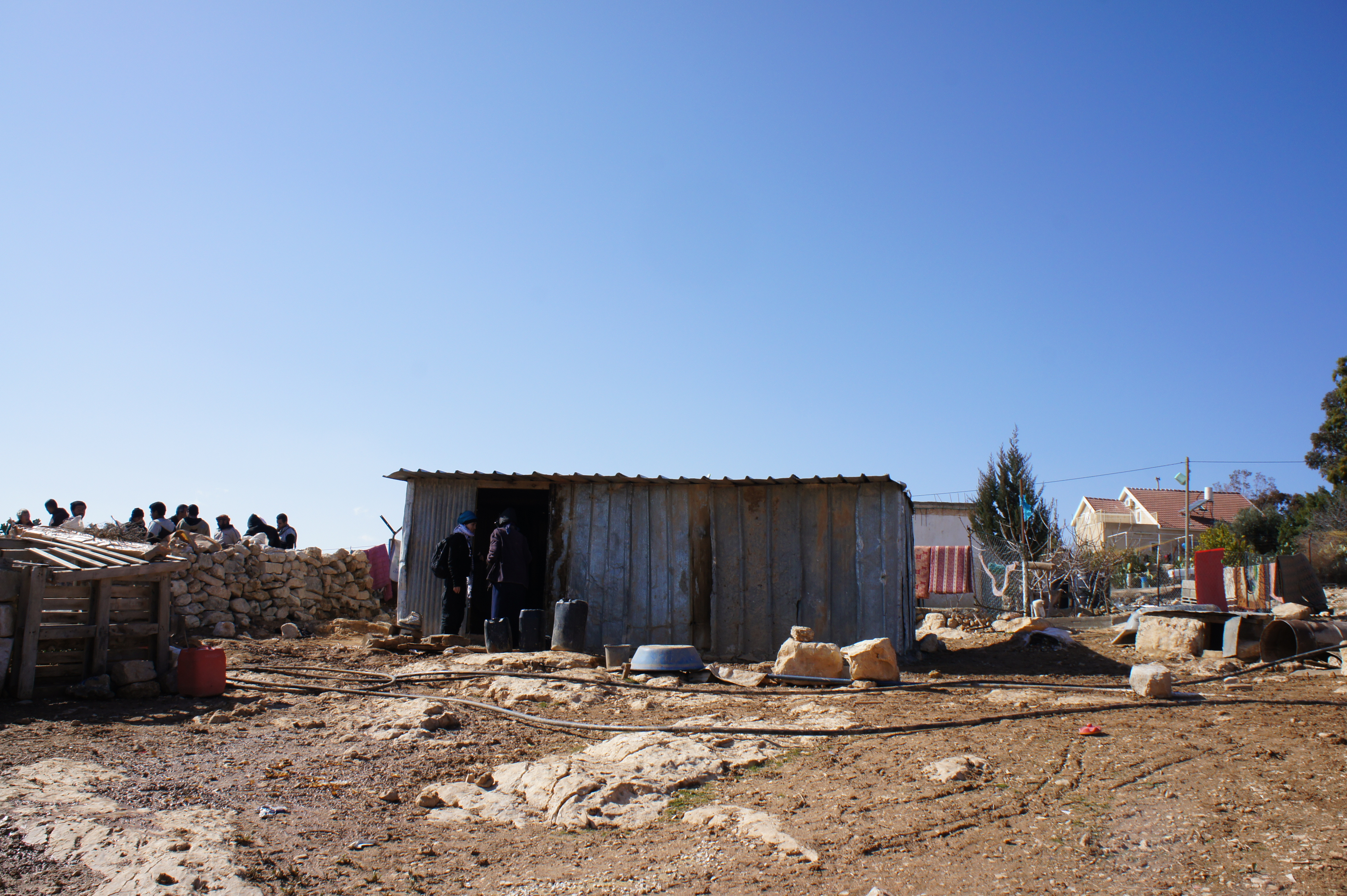
Umm al-Khair Palestinian village near Carmel

A continuity has often been observed between the Realpolitik (Note: "The very nature of settler states, their establishment, consolidation and driving ideology, requires a realpolitik approach to the indigenous population(s) because the state itself can be established only at their expense and the expense of their descendants. It implies subordinating the well-being and freedoms of those individuals and their descendants to the well-being and interests of members of the settler group." (Graff 2015, p. 163)) processes governing the creation of Israel and the practices adopted with regard to the West Bank. (Note: "It is important to emphasize that settler colonial objectives have informed Zionist actions pre-1948, post-1948, and post-1967. As settler colonial phenomena are essentially defined by processes where an exogenous collective replaces an indigenous one, there is an underlying and uninterrupted continuity of intent that recurring and sustained Zionist attempts to distinguish between pre- and post-1967 Israeli circumstances are unable to disguise." (Veracini 2013, p. 28)) (Note: "To export a European problem, a more or less shared anti-Semitism from East to West with an admitted peak in the Center of Europe and drop it, not at the doorstep, but well inside the house of the Arabs, can only be understood against a background of century-long traditions of Western colonialism." (Galtung 1971, p. 175)) Several analysts have likened the process to enclosure – the "establishment of exclusionary Jewish spaces on the Palestinian landscape" being heir to the English appropriation of common land and its conversion to private use – or to the conversion of Amerindian land into "white property". (Note: "The state of Israel's ideology is explicitly an exclusionary ethnoculturally based nationalism. Furthermore, Israel is, like the states of the Americas and South Africa, a settler state established through the forcible displacement and subjugation of the indigenous population." (Graff 2015, pp. 163, 166))

Early Zionist policy for land appropriation was outlined by Menachem Ussishkin in 1904 and, aside from voluntary sales, also foresaw the need to seize land by war and compel sale through expropriation via the ruling authority. It called this practice "colonization", a word which, since 1967, has been replaced by the euphemism "settlement". (Note: "The centrality of the 'settlement enterprise' within the occupation is partially obscured by the use of the multivalent and anodyne term settlement, a word that among other meanings denotes the ending of a dispute or the calming of a contestation. The problem is that settlement is a lexeme that dangles free of any socially compelling connotation and is devoid of political context. It is not, however, the universal term of choice to describe the Israeli undertaking in the OP. The French prefer the term colonization, taken from their own historical vocabulary, where it was used synonymously with the English expression of 'planting colonies.'... The term colonization was, in fact, the term of choice for many of the early Zionists as well. In the 1880s, the settlers of the first aliyah (wave of Jewish immigration to Palestine between 1882 and 1903) named their form of settlement moshavs, the Hebrew equivalent of colony. Arthur Ruppin, head of the World Zionist Organization's Jaffa office, titled his 1926 book The Agricultural Colonization of the Zionist Organization in Palestine, and Ze'ev Jabotinsky not only used the term in his famed 1923 article (On)The Iron Wall but sought to dispel any confusion about its meaning and significance as follows:'Colonization carries its own explanation, the only possible explanation, unalterable and clear as daylight to every Jew and every Arab with his wits about him.' Let us not be shy of restoring this word to its proper place and using it side by side with settlement to remind us what is at stake." (Shafir 2017, pp. 53–54))

The technique developed over the decades of early settlement was one of incremental spread, setting up tower-and-stockade outposts, a pattern repeated in the West Bank after 1967. A quote attributed to Joseph Trumpeldor summed up Zionist logic: "Wherever the Jewish plow plows its last furrow, that is where the border will run". The principle of this slow steady establishing of "facts on the ground" before the adversary realizes what is going on, is colloquially known as "dunam after dunam, goat after goat". The model applied to the West Bank was that used for the Judaization of the Galilee, consisting of setting up a checkered pattern of settlements not only around Palestinian villages but in between them. In addition to settlements considered legal, with government sponsorship, there are some 90 Israeli outposts (2013) built by private settler initiatives which, though illegal even in Israeli terms, are defended by the IDF. From the mid-1990s to 2015 many of these, such as Amona, Avri Ran's Giv'ot Olam and Ma'ale Rehav'am – the latter on 50 dunams of private Palestinian land – were directly funded, according to Haaretz, by loans from the World Zionist Organization through Israeli taxpayer money, since its approximate $140 million income derives from Israel and is mostly invested in settlements in the West Bank.

The first site chosen for settlement was Gush Etzion, on some 75 acres (30 ha) worked by Palestinian refugees. (Note: Israeli advisers, from 1984 onwards, assisted the government of Sri Lanka in stamping out the Tamil Revolt, in a conflict where the Tamils were likened to Palestinians to be smote hip and thigh like the Philistines, and the encroachment of Sinhalese settlements to fragment Tamil villages was likened to the function of Gush Etzion, in turning the Jaffna Peninsula into a kind of West Bank (Pieterse 1984, p. 67).) Hanan Porat was inspirational, intending by developing the settlement in order to put in place a practical application of the radical messianic Zionism of Rabbi Zvi Yehuda Kook, (Note: "The movement behind Israel's civilian settlement throughout the Occupied Territories has been driven by religious and ideological motivations from day one." (Gordis & Levi 2017, p. 7)) whose father Abraham Isaac Kook's Mercaz HaRav yeshiva in particular has exercised considerable influence on Israel's policies regarding the West Bank. According to Eyal Benvenisti, a 1972 judgement by Supreme Court justice Moshe Landau, siding with a military commander's decision to assign electrical supply in the Hebron area to the Israel Electric Corporation rather than to a Palestinian company, was to prove pivotal to encouraging the settlement project, since it placed the latter under the jurisdiction of the military authorities.

During the first decade of Israel occupation, when the Israeli Labor Party held power, settlement was concentrated on constructing a ring of "residential fortresses" around the Palestinian population of Jerusalem, and in the Jordan Valley. According to Ibrahim Matar, the purpose of this colonizing strategy around Jerusalem was to hem in and block the expansion of the Palestinian population, and to incentivize Palestinian emigration by inducing a sense among the Palestinians of living in a ghetto.

Between 1967 and 1977, settlement was small-scale (Note: 42,650 dunams were set aside for colonial settlement in 1970–1971; 8,850 dunums in 1971–1972; 8,807 in 1973–1974; 10,722 in 1974–1975 and 1,653 in 1975–1976 (Merip 1977, p. 14).) totaling the transfer of 3,200 Israelis into the West Bank. By the end of Labor's term of power in 1977, 4,500 Israelis had established themselves in 30 West Bank settlements and some 50,000 in settlements in East Jerusalem. It was with the rise to power of Menachem Begin's Likud Party, driven by a "Greater Israel theology" that year, which led to an incremental expansion of this projects, and marked in the view of Oren Yiftachel the peak of Israel's ethnocratic project, with the West Bank to become "the bedrock of Jewish national identity". A change in territorial focus took place, with settlements now promoted in the biblical heartland of the West Bank next to Palestinian population centres. The main plank of Likud's platform, still unaltered, called for the immediate annexation of the West Bank. (Note: The main reason this was not acted on at the time was that Moshe Dayan made its preclusion a premise for his joining the new government as Defense Minister, and because inclusion would have immediately created a bi-national state, with a very large Arab internal population (Kimmerling 2003, pp. 15–17).) If security calculations influenced the relatively small-scale settlements advanced by the Israeli Labor Party, the reconfirmation of Likud in 1981 led to a rapid escalation of settlement as a religious-national programme.

At the same time the military censors forbade the local Palestinian press from reporting any news about settlements, expropriations or legal moves made to block them. By 1983, settlers in the West Bank numbered 28,400. (Note: Yiftachel misprints 129,000 by the end of Likud's second term in 1984. Ian Lustick puts the figure at 44,000.(Yiftachel 2006, p. 66; Lustick 2018, p. 11)) Incentives consisting of government mortgage and housing subsidies, tax incentives, business grants, free schooling, infrastructure projects, and defense were provided. After the Oslo Accords down to 2002, the settler population doubled.

In 1972 the number of Israeli settlers in Area C were 1,200, in 1993 110,000, and in 2010 310,000 (excluding East Jerusalem). Before 1967 there were between 200,000 and 320,000 Palestinians in the Jordan Valley, which, together with the northern Dead Sea, covers 30% of the West Bank and constituted the "most significant land reserve" for Palestinians, 85% of whom are barred from entering it. By 2011, 37 settlements had been established among the 64,451 Palestinians there (who constitute 29 communities) 70% of whom live in Area A in Jericho. According to ARIJ, by 2015 only 3 of 291 Palestinian communities in Area C received Israeli building approval (on just 5.7 hectares), and any construction outside that was subject to demolition. In that one year, they calculate, Israel confiscated a further 41,509 hectares, demolished 482 homes – displacing 2,450 people – uprooted 13,000 trees, and subjected Palestinians and their property to assault on some 898 distinct occasions. Israeli settlements constituted 6% of the land, while military zones had been declared over 29%.

From 1967 to 2003, successive Israeli governments assisted the transfer of some 230,000 Jewish civilians into 145 West Bank and Gaza settlements and approximately 110 outposts. By 2016, approximately 42% of the settlement workforce (55,440) found employment in those settlements. The ultra-Orthodox have dominated the process from the beginning: from 2003 to 2007 alone the population of Beitar Illit, whose construction was facilitated by the expropriation of 1,500 dunams of Naḥḥālīn farmland, rose 40%, while Modi'in Illit, built on the Palestinian village lands of Ni'lin, Kharbata, Saffa, Bil'in and Dir Qadis, increased by 55%.

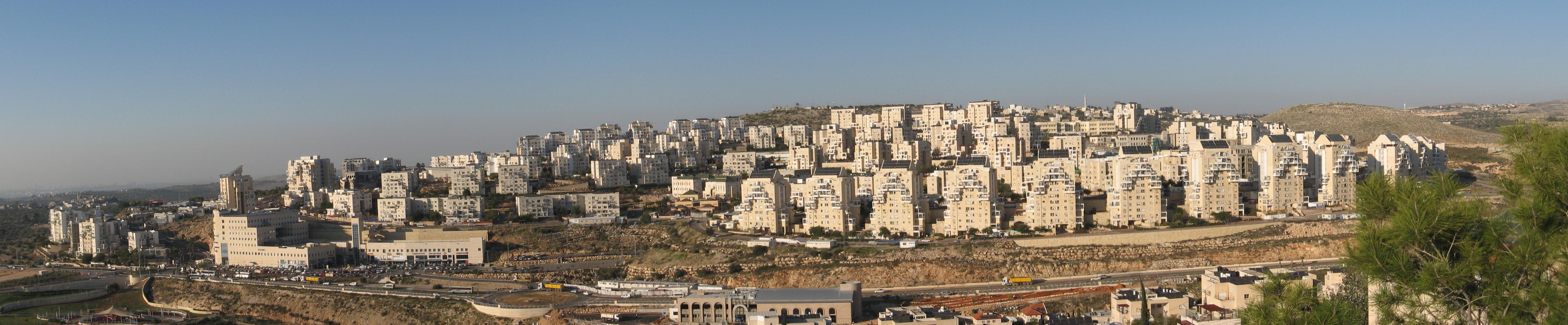
Modi'in Illit, the biggest Israeli settlement of the occupied West Bank (Area C), in 2012

The majority of Israeli West Bank agriculture arises from contracts with the World Zionist Organization that bypass direct contracts with the Israeli Land Regulating Commissioner, and many were given to use private Palestinian land. With the Regularization Law of 2017, Israel retroactively legalized the settler takeover of thousands of hectares of privately owned Palestinian land and some 4,500 homes which settlers had built without obtaining official permits. By that year, the fifth decade of occupation, Israel had managed to establish (2017) 237 settlements, housing roughly 580,000 settlers.

One technique used to established settlements was to set up a paramilitary encampment for army personnel to be used for agricultural and military training for soldiers. These were then slowly transformed into civilian settlements, often without official approval. This could be justified as legal because they were initially IDF bases without civilians. Another technique was to render land momentarily unusable. Gitit for example was established by closing off 5,000 dunams of the village lands of Aqraba and then spraying it with defoliants.

On occasion, creating settlements is hailed as a measure to punish Palestinians collectively, as a reaction to a Palestinian killing of a settler, or in response to the granting of non-member observer status to the Palestinian State by the United Nations, an announcement which generated plans for a further 3,000 settler homes in the West Bank. Economic motivations also drive settlement: selling a 50–60 sq. m. apartment in Jerusalem allows the purchase of an apartment three times larger in settlements like Ma’aleh Adumim. One early metaphor likened the expansion of settlements to the baobab tree in The Little Prince, whose seeds take root and eventually cover the entire planet. By the early eighties, several authoritative observers, among them Eyal Benvenisti, already concluded that the settlement expansion was close to a point of no return from total annexation. The impression left of the landscape has been described as follows:

Israeli settlements form an upper-middle-class oasis of green grass, shopping malls, and swimming pools amidst open desert and enclaves of Palestinian refugee camps, villages, and towns with limited access to water. (Note: "Not so long ago, Yata was hardly more than a village; today it spills over the golden-brown hilltops for miles-many refugees from the caves and elsewhere have come to rest, for now, in the town. Yata is poor, dry, unfinished, littered with the inevitable flotsam and jetsam of modern Palestine-the wrecks of old cars, the dusty grocery shops, the graffiti left over from the last election, the sheep and goats and barefoot children, the disintegrating old stone houses dwarfed by ugly, recent buildings, the medieval ruins overgrown by scraggly grass and thorns." (Shulman 2018, p. 12))

American citizens lead the diaspora in moving into West Bank settlements, with 12% stating their first choice of residency is "Judea and Samaria". They now form the predominant block and number an estimated 60,000.

=== Legal status ===
Before proceeding with settlement, the government sought legal advice from their resident expert on international law, Theodor Meron. (Note: Meron as a youth had survived 4 years in the Nazi concentration camp at Częstochowa and Gorenberg comments "The boy who received his first education in war crimes as a victim was on his way to becoming one of the world's most prominent experts on the limits that nations put on the conduct of war." (Gorenberg 2007, p. 100)) His top secret memorandum stated unequivocally that the prohibition on any such population transfer was categorical, and that "civilian settlement in the administered territories contravenes the explicit provisions of the Fourth Geneva Convention", indicating that the Prime Minister Levi Eshkol was therefore aware the promotion of settlements in the West Bank would be illegal. The International community has also since rejected Israel's unwillingness to accept the applicability of the Geneva Conventions to the territories it occupies, with most arguing all states are duty bound to observe them. Israel alone challenges this premise, arguing that the West Bank and Gaza are "disputed territories", and that the Conventions do not apply because these lands did not form part of another state's sovereign territory, and that the transfer of Jews into areas like the West Bank is not a government act but a voluntary movement by Israeli Jewish people. (Note: "The Israeli Foreign Ministry has also contributed a rationale for rejecting Israel's de jure obligation to uphold the Fourth Convention, arguing that the Convention only prohibits civilian transfers compelled by the government, not voluntary transfers undertaken by the civilians themselves. Recall the language of Article 49: 'The Occupying Power shall not transfer its own civilians into the territory it occupies' (emphasis added). On the Foreign Minister's reading, even if the Geneva Convention applies, voluntary transfers do not violate it, because the Occupying Power is not doing the transfer." (Galchinsky 2004, pp. 120–121) For Yoram Dinstein, one exception to the ban on "transfer" in FGC Art. 49 would be settlement not made "under the cloak of a government-coordinated (and subsidized) scheme, by dint of official organization or institutional encouragement" but which were created by individual Israeli nationals, whether on land that was privately owned by Jews before 1948 or on parcels of private land purchased at full market value from Palestinians with title to it.)

The International Court of Justice also determined that Israeli settlements in the West Bank were established in breach of international law in their 2004 advisory opinion on the West Bank barrier. In 1980, Israel declined to sign the Vienna Convention on the Law of Treaties which obliges national laws to give way to international law when the two conflict, and regulates settlements in terms of its own laws, in lieu of any compulsion to observe its treaty commitments and by arguing that all the relevant UN bodies adjudicating the matter are "anti-Zionist and anti-Semitic". (Note: Derek Penslar has argued that, "Israel, unlike the Jewish global conspiracy of the European antisemitic imagination, does exist. Precisely because Arab antisemitism's fantasies are far more thoroughly grounded in reality than those of their European predecessors, a necessary, although admittedly insufficient, precondition for deconstructing those fantasies will be a radical transformation of Israel's borders and policies towards Arabs both within and outside of the state." (Penslar 2007, p. 129))

=== Settler violence ===
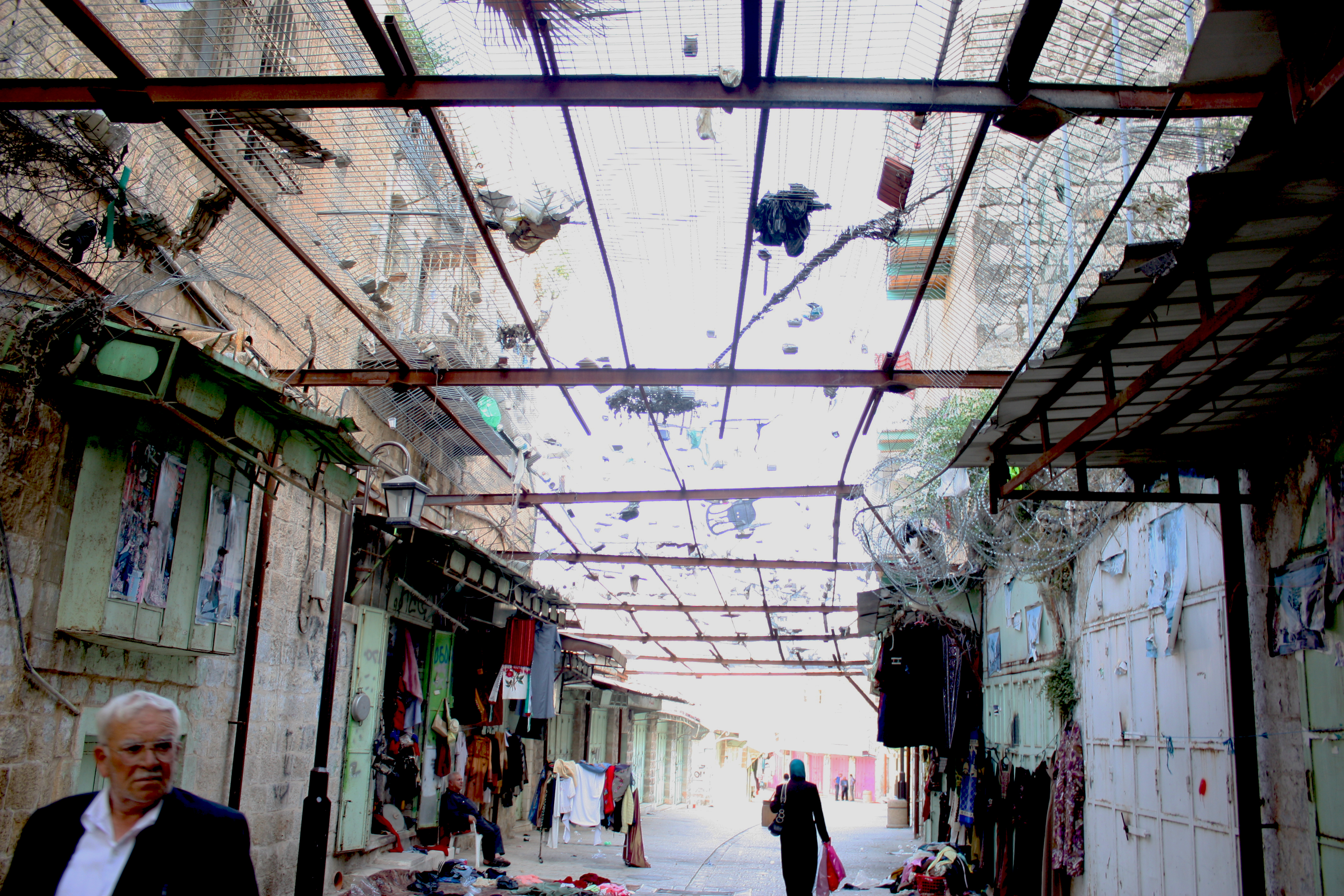
Fences to protect Palestinians in the old town of Hebron from the garbage thrown by Israeli settlers on the upper floors, 2010

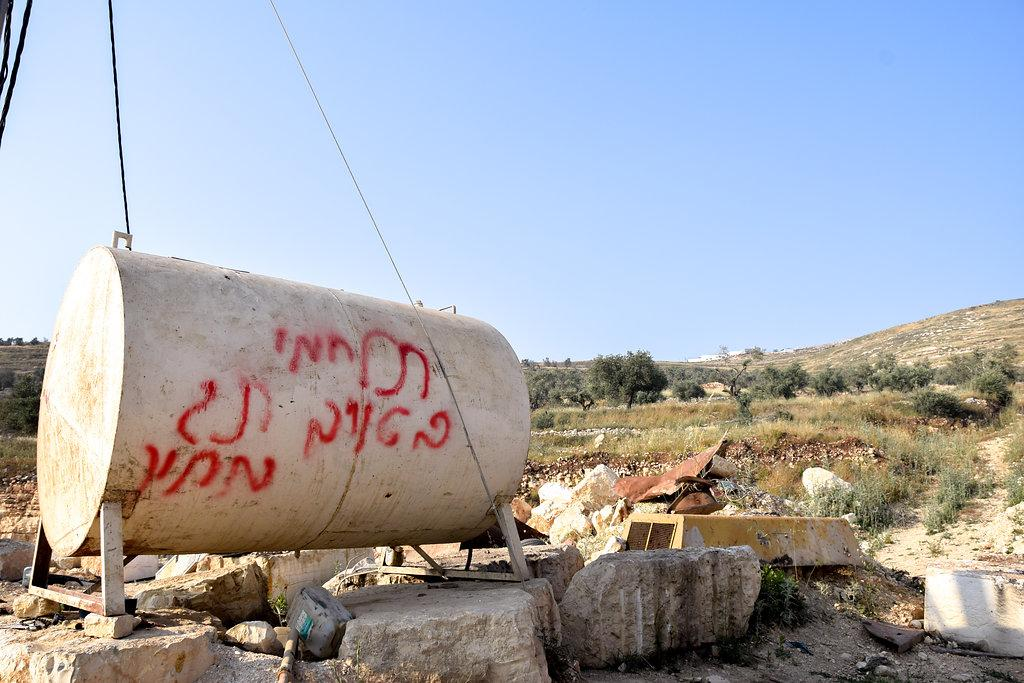
"Fight the enemy. Price Tag." Hebrew Graffiti spray-painted by Israeli settlers in Urif

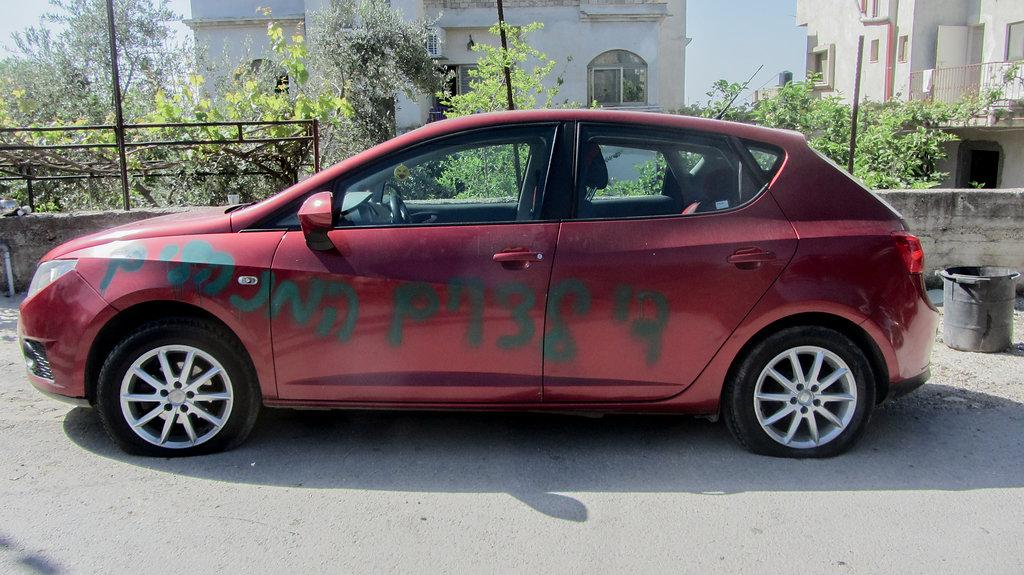
"No more administrative orders." Graffiti spray-painted in Hebrew by Israeli settlers on a car in Fara'ata, 2018

Though settler vigilantism dates back to the late 1970s, when they were authorized to bear arms in self-defense – one ordinance exempted them from military service in Israel while drafting them into West Bank units and another gave them powers to demand Palestinians provide identification and even to arrest them – settler terrorism formally dates back at least to the Jewish Underground movement of the early 1980s, which began by targeting and severely maiming, through the deployment of car bombs, West Bank mayors such as Bassam Shakaa of Nablus, and Karim Khalaf of Ramallah. In the first two years of the First Intifada, settlers killed at least 34 Palestinians, four below the age of 16, with 11 killed by settler initiative at home or while guarding flocks; a further six probably died through settler actions, and eight were killed in response to stone throwing at cars. Only two died as a result of clashes. In the 1980s attempts by one Jewish terrorist group led by Meir Kahane to set up settlements were blocked by other settlers, the heads of Gush Emunim, though Kahane's views would later motivate the Cave of the Patriarchs Massacre in Hebron.

From 2009 such settler violence escalated rapidly, an uptick that coincided with a dramatic fall in Palestinian terror attacks. In 2009, 200 settler attacks took place, a figure which doubled to over 400 by 2011. Of the latter, nearly 300 consisted in attacks on Palestinian property, causing 100 Palestinian casualties, and the destruction of roughly 10,000 trees. Many of these are carried out as Price tag acts, (Note: "The goal of these acts of sabotage, known as 'Price Tag', is to send a message to the government that dismantling settlements and illegal outposts will be met with retaliation and rioting... Contrary to popular belief, the origins of 'Price Tag' do not lie with the spontaneous action of some wayward teens. This is a carefully thought-out strategy set in motion by the very heart of the settler establishment – the Regional Councils in the West Bank, which initially also oversaw implementation." (Gordis & Levi 2017, p. 21)) which target innocent Palestinians and are designed to intimidate the local population. Yesh Din discovered that of 781 such incidents covered from 2005 to 2011, 90% of the Israeli investigations were closed without indictments, and many of the culprits were Hilltop Youth. In an analysis of 119 cases of settlers killing Palestinians, it emerged that only 13 were sent to jail: six were convicted of murder, only one of whom was sentenced to life imprisonment, while of seven convicted of manslaughter, one received a prison sentence of seven and a half years for killing a child, and the rest were given light sentences.

Writing in 2012, Daniel Byman and Natan Sachs judged that the pattern of settler violence was "undoubtedly working" and achieving its ends, by influencing the way Palestinians view Israelis, strengthening the hand of terrorists among them, and by seeding fears in the Israeli government that any pullout in exchange for peace would lead to conflict with settlers and a political disaster for the political parties involved.

== State of asymmetric war ==
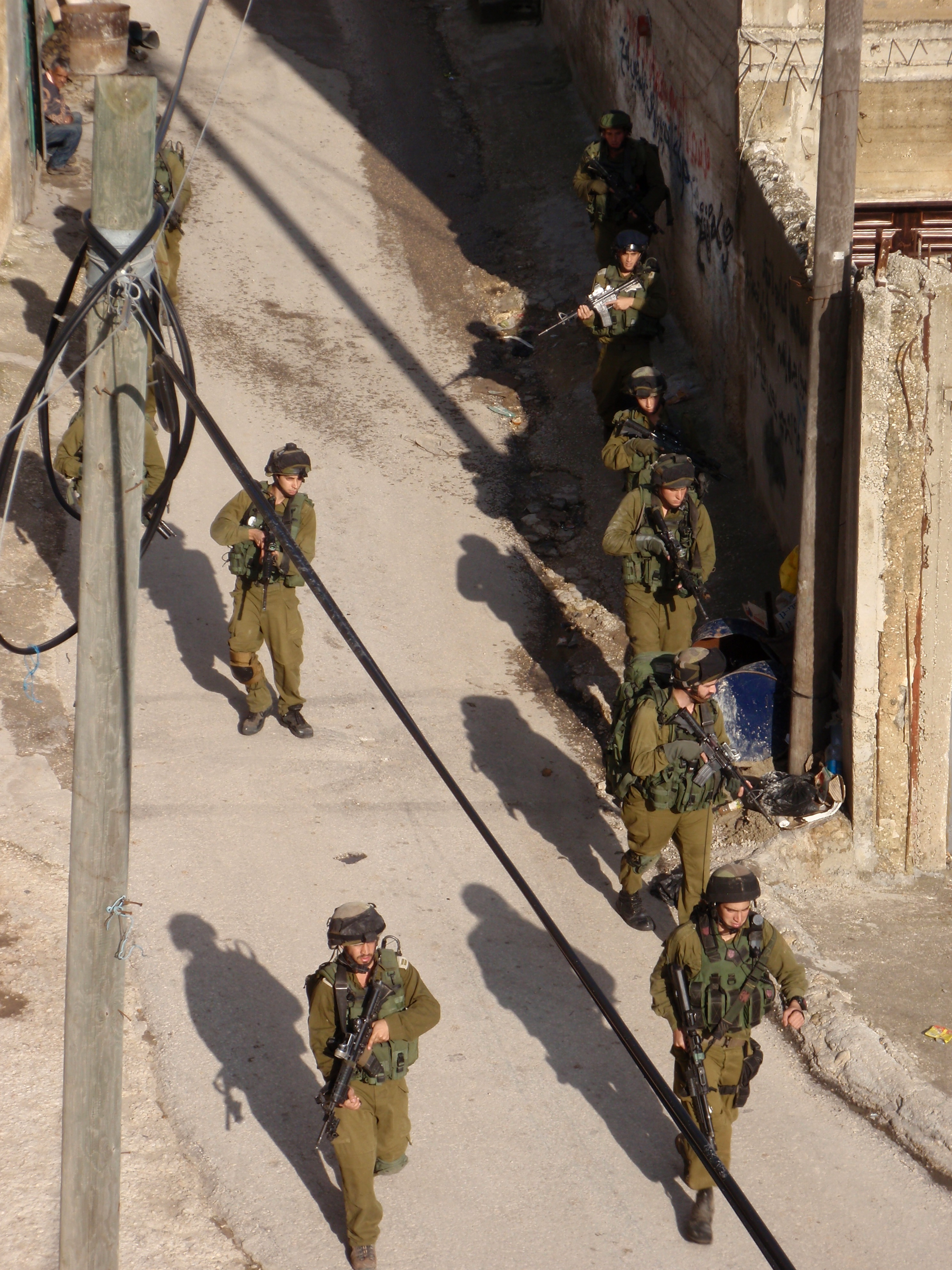
Israeli soldiers patrolling Awarta.

West Bank Palestinians have engaged in two uprisings that have led to an asymmetric set of wars of attrition, between the occupying power and the occupied people. This characterization has been further refined by classifying the conflict as structurally asymmetric, where the root cause of tension lies in the standoff between a colonizer and the colonized, and in which the large power imbalance in favour of the dominator leads to a resort to guerilla tactics or terrorism by the dominated. (Note: "These terms are used in a neutral and value-free sense. In saying that someone is in the dominator position, we refer to the objective fact that he/she belongs to the stronger side in the relationship without necessarily attaching to this fact a value or an ethical judgment. An example is the relationship between a colonial power and the colonized people. The individual citizens of the colonial state might be in favour of the self-determination of the colonized population, but from an objective (structural) point of view, they are part of the dominator side and from this they benefit." (Gallo & Marzano 2009, pp. 1–18, 2–3, 3–4)) Much of what Palestinians defend as acts of "resistance" are, in Israeli usage, regarded as "terrorism". Making speeches calling on fellow Palestinians to resist the occupation is construed in Israeli law as tantamount to advocacy of terrorism. In the case of the parliamentarian Azmi Bishara, the Knesset voted to lift his parliamentary immunity in order to pave the way for a criminal indictment on this charge.

International law does not address the issue regarding the rights of an occupied people to resist an occupation which flagrantly violates fundamental human rights. The United Nations General Assembly Resolution 1514 established that force may not be used to deny self-determination, and that recourse to force to resist colonial or alien domination is legitimate. (Note: "First, force to deny self-determination is prohibited under international law. Second, and conversely, 'forcible resistance to forcible denial of self-determination—by imposing or maintaining colonial or alien domination—is legitimate according to the Declaration.' Third, movements to achieve self-determination, although not qualifying as states, have standing in international law, including the right to receive support from outside actors. Finally, third-party governments can treat such movements as legitimate without encroaching on the rights of the state exercising control over the territory and its inhabitants." (Falk 2002, p. 26))

The two fundamental preconditions for containing conflict – clearly defined borders and rough power parity between the parties at war – are absent, with a pronounced economic and military disparity favouring Israel. The disparity extends, according to Nathan Thrall, to the numerous negotiations over a peace settlement. (Note: "Palestinians and Israelis would be trading fundamentally unlike assets, one tangible, the other intangible. Palestinians would give up moral claims, acquiescing in the denial of their right to return and bestowing legitimacy on their dispossessors by recognizing the vast majority of their homeland as a Jewish state. Israelis, by contrast, would be committing to a physical withdrawal from land under their full control. The crucial difference between these two types of assets is that, once the parties had accepted the parameters, only the intangible ones would disappear. The land, by contrast, would remain in Israel's possession until the parties reached a comprehensive settlement, an outcome that an agreed framework by no means guarantees." (Thrall 2017, pp. 220–221)) According to Aharon Klieman, even Israeli negotiating tactics with Palestinians follow the principles of warfare used by the IDF. (Note: "Applying many of the principles of IDF warfare to bargaining, soldiers in mufti are prone to treat diplomatic talks as analogous to wars of attrition and conducting them according to one of two models: either as a game of waiting out the opponent, or as a lightening offensive aimed at breaking the back of resistance. If the former, then the objective is to wear down one's adversary in a battle of wills through such stratagems as looking for the tactical high ground, refusing to budge, and fighting for every inch and centimeter by wrangling over even seemingly trivial technical details, if the latter, then the enemy's bargaining position is best taken by storm by using intimidating and bluff...The basic inclination is to assume neither goodwill nor magnanimity on the part of the Arab opponents." (Peri 2006, p. 238))

=== Armaments (Israel) ===
In terms of armaments, Israel is reputed to have "the strongest and best-equipped army of the Middle East." The arsenal at Israel's disposal to counteract major Palestinian uprisings ranges from F-16 fighters, Merkava tanks, (Note: Tanks have been reported pulping teenagers who had been shot while attempting to attack settlers (Sait 2004, p. 217).) Apache helicopters, (Note: "20,000 Israeli soldiers, accompanied by tanks, Apache helicopters, and F-16 warplanes,.. attacked the most populous residential areas of the West Bank...Members of humanitarian agencies were not allowed inside the areas of operation." (Jamjoum 2002, pp. 54, cf.64)) Hellfire missiles, massive armoured D9 Caterpillar bulldozers. (Note: Bulldozers were used in the Battle of Jenin and razed houses with family members in them (Jamjoum 2002, p. 64).) to the standard M-16 rifle and the use of snipers.

The Israeli techniques for daily dispersing protesting crowds differ according to the ethnicity of the protestors. With Jewish settlers by and large the methods are those policing approaches used in Western countries, and they are reported as not intervening when settlers go on the rampage against Palestinians. With Palestinians, contrariwise, military tactics are adopted, and observers such as B'Tselem claim lack of proportionality and recourse to firearms is characteristic. With the latter at demonstrations Israeli forces have drawn on rash gas, tear gas canisters (which have often produced fatalities); shooting into crowds with rubber-coated steel bullets, which can be lethal; (Note: Between 2000 and 2012, at least 18 Palestinians, among them 12 minors, were killed by such bullets (Michaeli 2013, p. 21).) high-velocity bullets; recourse to the use of live ammunition rounds; the deployment from 2008 of trucks dousing whole areas with putrid Skunk spray; stun grenades; water cannons; pepper spray; capsaisin projectiles; (Note: This was a new Riot Control Agent (RCA) first reported in the West Bank in July 2002. It consists of small plastic projectiles fired from launchers, and causing an effect like an electric shock, and reportedly its effects induced severe skin injuries are far more serious than those caused by pepperball tactical powder munitions (Crowley, McLeish & Revill 2018, p. 589)) deployment of snatch squads and mista'arvim and sponge rounds. The use of rubber-coated metal bullets is allowed in the West Bank but forbidden from deployment against people within Israel. Also deployed on occasion since 2005 when they were used at Bil’in, are loud sound-wave generating devices, gravel-throwing machines; shock-inducing polystyrene and bismuth metal paintball pellets, and tasers. In the first Intifada, snipers targeted youths primarily to maim them, with dum dum shots to the right arm biceps crippling their use by stone-throwers for life. (Note: Dum dum ammunition was subsequently banned by Israel's Judge Advocate General (Harel 2003).)

=== Armaments (Palestinians) ===
The primary value developed by Palestinians to resist the occupation from 1967 has been ṣumūd, hanging on stubbornly, a steadfast perseverance in remaining on one's land, even if it turns into a prison, (Note: "Sumūd is watching your home turn into a prison. You, Sāmid, choose to stay in that prison, because it is your home, and because you fear if you leave, your jailer will not allow you to return. Living like this you must constantly resist the twin temptations of either acquiescing in the jailer's plan in numb despair, or becoming crazed by consuming hatred for your jailer and yourself, the prisoner." Radi Shehadeh (Slyomovics 1991, p. 19).) in the face of Jewish hitnahalut (settlement). The word itself was consistently repressed from Palestinian papers by Israeli censors in the early decades. Mubarak Awad, founder of the Palestinian Centre for the Study of Nonviolence, endeavoured to inculcate Gandhian principles of non-violence in the West Bank, and was subsequently expelled and sent into exile by Israel on the grounds that he was preaching non-violence only as a cover for an armed struggle for liberation. The village of Bil'in, one of the first villages, along with Budrus and Abu Dis, to practice Gandhian methods of non-violent resistance, has in one decade (2005–2015) been subjected to incessant night raids, seen hundreds of its residents arrested, its leader Abdullah Abu Rahmeh put on trial five times and sentenced to imprisonment, and thousands of demonstrators injured.

The mainstay of Palestinian armed resistance techniques to the occupation during the First Intifada, which was generally non-lethal, (Note: Benny Morris: "I saw the first intifada that erupted in the winter of 1987 as an effort of a people to throw off a 20-year military occupation. This effort, in the main, was not lethal, and the protesters did not use live-fire weapons." (Ben-Simhon 2012)) consisted of throwing stones at Israeli troops during clashes, or at military and settler vehicles bearing their distinctive yellow number plates, together with tire-burning, hurling Molotov cocktails and setting up roadblocks. The then-Defense Minister Yitzhak Rabin's policy was that, "rioters must emerge with casualties or scars." The juxtaposition of this primitive method with Israeli power was striking, with children and youths throwing stones and deploying slingshots against a fully equipped and highly trained military power exerting overwhelming superiority. (Note: "Their powerlessness is all the more pronounced given their occupation by a major military power. The juxtaposition of technologies is striking. Offensively and defensively, Palestinians wield stones, one of the earliest forms of weaponry known to humankind." (Peteet 1994, p. 35)) (Note: "These 'children of the stones'.. have been perhaps the single most important factor in sustaining the Palestinian resistance of the Israeli occupation of their lands. With the Palestinian Authority or militants unable to counter the overwhelming military superiority of the Israeli Defense Forces (IDF), it is the child protestors who continue to engage and frustrate the occupiers." (Sait 2004, p. 211))

Years later, a spiral in escalation led to the increased use of knifing and Palestinian suicide attacks corresponding to the expansion of deployment of warplanes, helicopters, and recourse to assassinations by Israel. (Note: The first attempted suicide bombing in the West Bank took place at the Israeli settlement of Mehola on 16 April 1993, killing only the bomber, though injuring 8 Israelis in nearby buses. The beginning of slashing with knives is sometimes dated to the immediate aftermath of the killing of 18 Palestinians on the Black Monday clashes of 8 October 1990, after they threw stones at Jews at prayer at the Western Wall. A lone wolf, Omar Abu Sirah, then ran amok killing three Israelis with his butcher's knife. This however was a one-off event for the period (Dzikansky, Kleiman & Slater 2016, pp. 32–33).) In the Al-Aqsa Intifada, suicide bombers, among which youths figured prominently, were deployed and became a central feature from 2001 to 2005, of the second uprising. Aside from the PLO's Fatah, many armed militant factions, Marxist, Islamic or otherwise, became involved, such as the Tanzim, the al-Aqsa Martyrs' Brigades, Hamas, Islamic Jihad Movement in Palestine, the Popular Front for the Liberation of Palestine, the Democratic Front for the Liberation of Palestine, and Popular Resistance Committees. This flared up into a large-scale military confrontation when, according to Ma'ariv, 700,000 rounds of ammunition were fired at West Bank crowds protesting the shooting of Palestinians in and around the Haram al-Sharif, killing 118 Palestinians, of whom 33 were teenagers. (Note: In talks that week with Jacques Chirac, Ehud Barak was told: "This morning, sixty-four Palestinians are dead, nine Israeli-Arabs were also killed, and you're pressing on. You cannot, Mr Prime Minister, explain this ratio in the number of [killed and] wounded. You cannot make anyone believe that the Palestinians are the aggressors.... If you continue to fire from helicopters on people throwing rocks, and you continue to refuse an international inquiry, you are turning down a gesture from Arafat." (Sher 2006, pp. 161–162)) From 2001 to 2007 Israel killed more Palestinians annually than it had over the first two decades of occupation, averaging 674 as opposed to the earlier 32 per year. Kill ratios between the first and second intifada differ markedly. One Israeli was killed for every 25 Palestinians in the first, whereas the figure for the first year of the second the ratio varied from one Israeli to 2.5/3 Palestinians. The earlier ratio of 25:1 was only reestablished by 2007.

The overall historic pattern of Palestinian violence in comparative terms, according to Nathan Thrall, appears to be far less participatory and deadly than other examples of local resistance to a foreign occupation. The four major outbreaks all began in civic demonstrations and strikes which, when violently repressed, led to a resort to violence. (Note: "(In) the four major wars Israel fought, Palestinian participation was extraordinarily low. In 1948, of a population of 1.3 million, only a few thousand Palestinians joined irregular forces or the Arab Salvation Army; in the 1956, 1967, and 1973 wars, Palestinian contributions were also slight. The violence that Palestinians did lead over the decades was many times less deadly than struggles against foreign occupiers elsewhere in the world. From the first Palestinian riots in 1920 until the end of June 2015, according to Israeli government sources, fewer than four thousand Jews (forty per year) were killed as a result of Palestinian violence, including the Intifadas and wars in Gaza." (Thrall 2017, pp. 137–138))

== Influence on other occupying regimes ==
In 1981, Ya'akov Meridor stated Israel aspired to play the role of "top proxy" for the United States in Central America. (Note: "In 1981, Ya'akov Meridor told a gathering of Israeli businessmen: 'Israel coveted the job of top Washington proxy in Central America'." (Pieterse 1984, p. 71)) By 1984, according to Jan Nederveen Pieterse, Israel had become one of the world's major arms exporters, the largest arms supplier to Central America and Sub-Saharan Africa, and globally active in the business of counterinsurgency, expertise in which was gained in enforcing land expropriations and settlements in the West Bank, the Gaza Strip and the Galilee. Knowledge of this background, he argued, was useful for assessing Israel's "export" of its methods, to countries like Guatemala, Honduras, Nicaragua, El Salvador and Sri Lanka, in some of which existed similar configurations of policy involving land, domination and exploitation, population policy, and terror. One settlement project in Costa Rica for example is thought to be based on Israeli expertise honed in West Bank projects.

The Israeli techniques of urban warfare against Palestinians in their towns and villages territories has influenced many other military powers. (Note: "One of the main reasons why Israeli military doctrine on urban operations became so influential among other militaries is that Israel's conflict with the Palestinians since the Intifada has had a distinct urban dimension." (Weizman 2012, p. 188)) Many argue that Israeli methods developed in their conflict with Palestinians have been a significant influence on U.S. military doctrines developed under the administration of George W. Bush. The American claim that new methods developed for the war on terror were necessary since the situation was unprecedented and therefore was a legal no man's land had a precedent in Israeli claims the war on terror in the West Bank was a legal terra nulla, and thus allowed approaches like extrajudicial and preemptive assassination, (Note: In 2002, the United States began employing the tactic of assassination, which had been prohibited by executive orders since 1977. Officials utilized Israeli-like reasoning to justify the assassination of 'Ali Qaed Sinan al-Harithi and five others (including a U.S.citizen) in Yemen by a pilotless drone (Hajjar 2006, p. 34).) a terminology already used by Israel with regard to its approach to resistance in the West Bank and Gaza. Jeff Halper has spoken of the risk of "Palestinizing" the American people as Israel has deepened its training programs for American police forces. (Note: "The American Jewish Institute for National Security Affairs (JINSA), an organization that holds there is no difference between the national security interests of the US and Israel, inaugurated its Law Enforcement Exchange Program (LEEP)... Over 9500 law enforcement officers have participated in twelve conferences thus far...The Anti-Defamation League (ADL) hosts an Advanced Training School twice a year in Washington, DC. Its 'School' has trained more than 1000 US law enforcement professionals, representing 245 federal, state and local agencies. The ADL also runs a National Counter-Terrorism Seminar (NCTS) in Israel, bringing law enforcement officers from across the US to Israel for a week of intensive counter-terrorism training, as well as connecting American law enforcement officials with the Israel National Police, the IDF and Israel's intelligence and security services." (Halper 2020))

Hoover Institution Fellow and Senior Fellow at the Joint Special Operations University Thomas H. Henriksen writes that:

The Israel Defense Forces' (IDF) military actions have been – and are – a crucible for methods, procedures, tactics, and techniques for the United States, which faces a similarly fanatical foe across the world in the Global War on Terror... Israeli experiences offer an historical record and a laboratory for tactics and techniques in waging counter-insurgencies or counterterrorist operations in America's Post-9/11 circumstances.

== Legal status ==
The legality of the occupation itself, while remaining much less covered than specific violations of international humanitarian law, has drawn increasing attention from scholars and the international community, with multiple United Nations General Assembly resolutions describing the occupation itself as illegal. Scholars have largely concluded that, regardless of whether it was initially legal, the occupation has become illegal over time. Reasons cited for its illegality include use of force for impermissible purposes such as annexation, violation of the Palestinian right to self-determination, that the occupation itself is an illegal regime "of alien subjugation, domination and exploitation", or some combination of these factors. Eyal Benvenisti suggested that refusal by an occupier to engage in good faith with efforts to reach a peaceful solution should not only be considered illegal but as outright annexation. International law scholar Ralph Wilde states that "The common way of understanding the extended duration of the occupation... is a prolonged violation of international law". However, Israel denies that it is occupying the territory and maintains that its presence is legal.

In 2022 a United Nations fact-finding mission released a report calling on the United Nations Security Council to end Israel's "permanent occupation" and for individual UN member states to prosecute Israeli officials. The report found "reasonable grounds" to conclude that the occupation "is now unlawful under international law due to its permanence" and Israel's "de-facto annexation policies". Israeli prime minister Yair Lapid said the report is "biased, false, inciting and blatantly unbalanced" and tweeted that "Not all criticism of Israel is anti-Semitism, but this report was written by anti-Semites … and is a distinctly anti-Semitic report". Later, the International Court of Justice accepted a request to study study the legality of the Israeli occupation and in 2024 concluded that Israel should put an end to its illegal occupation of the Palestinian territories.

== Territorial fragmentation and domination over the Palestinians ==
=== Background ===
In 1920 Israel Zangwill argued that creating a state free of Jews would require a South African type of "racial redistribution". In 1931 Arnold Toynbee prophesied that, given the nature of the Zionist project to secure land only for Jewish use to the exclusion of Palestinian labour, that the British mandatory government would be forced eventually to compensate the process by legislation that would create a land reservation for the exclusive use of Palestinians. He drew a parallel with the situation in South Africa under the Natives Land Act, 1913 which established the principle of segregation. (Note: "Sooner or later, the Palestine Government will have to legislation in this connection. I think they will have in the end to proclaim by law what will in effect be an Arab land-reservation. The Palestine Government will have to estimate the amount of cultivable land which is needed in order to provide the Arab rural population with a livelihood at a reasonable standard of living under certain future conditions, that is, when the economic potentialities of the total cultivable area of Palestine have been fully developed and when the agricultural methods of the Palestinian Arab peasant have been improved as far as they can be. When those conditions have been attained, it will, I believe, be found necessary to set aside, by Palestinian legislation, a certain proportion of the land of Palestine as an exclusive preserve for the Arabs, in view of the fact that all the Palestinian land which is purchased by Jewish funds is becoming, as I believe, inevitably an exclusive preserve for the Jews. You see what this means. It means what in South Africa is called segregation. I prophesy that, on the ultimate map of population and land-holding in Palestine, the Jewish population and the land in Jewish hands will be separated geographically from the Arab population and from the land in Arab hands. The two communities in Palestine will be segregated into two separate geographical blocks." (Toynbee 1931, p. 53)) These segregated territorial reserves were the forerunners of the bantustans, a word that gained currency only much later in the 1940s. After the foundation of Israel in 1948, its first president Chaim Weizmann and South African Prime Minister Jan Smuts supported each other's view on the racial basis of their respective states and their rights over indigenous lands.

=== Planning for fragmentation ===
The official "Master Plan for the Development of Samaria and Judea to the year 2010" (1983) foresaw the creation of a belt of concentrated Jewish settlements linked to each other and Israel beyond the Green line while disrupting the same links joining Palestinian towns and villages along the north–south highway, impeding any parallel ribbon development for Arabs and leaving the West Bankers scattered, unable to build up larger metropolitan infrastructure, and out of sight of the Israeli settlements. The result has been called a process of "enclavization", ghettoization, (Note: "During the late 1970s and 1980s Israel also continued relentlessly to expand its land control over the territories... This expansion was backed by a tight check over the development of Palestinian villages and towns, where hundreds of houses on private lands were demolished every year on the grounds that they were illegal or, more recently, a threat to the security of Jewish settlers. Other forms of Palestinian commercial and public development were stifled by the restrictive policies of military government, in effect ghettoizing the locals in their towns and villages and making them dependent on distant Jewish employment." (Yiftachel 2006, p. 67)) typified most visibly by the enclosure of Qalqilya in a concrete wall, or what Ariel Sharon called the Bantustan model, an allusion to the apartheid system, and one which many argue, makes Israel's occupational policies not dissimilar, despite different origins, from the South African model. (Note: "By carefully exploring the South African apartheid edifice, particularly the Bantustans, and comparing it with the structural developments set in place in the Palestinian territory since the Oslo process, it shows how the West Bank and Gaza Strip have moved towards a process of 'Bantustanization' rather than of sovereign independence." (Farsakh 2005, p. 231)) In particular it bears comparison to the policies applied in South Africa to the Transkei, (Note: "South Africa's homeland policy exhibits a similar architecture of domination combined with racial arithmetic as applied by Israel: Transkei, for example, is characterized by 'physical fragmentation of territory, combined with ethnic dispersal'." (Pieterse 1984, p. 65)) a policy that may have a broader geopolitical reach, if the Yinon Plan is to be taken as an indication of Israeli policy. The World Bank argued in 2009 that creating economic islands in the West Bank and Gaza is a developmental dead-end that would only imperil the construction of an economically unified and viable Palestinian state.

One observed function of the Separation Barrier is to seize large swathes of land thought important for future settlement projects, notoriously in the case of the area of Susya absorbing land worked by Bedouin herders with proven Ottoman title to the terrain. The construction, significantly inspired by the ideas of Arnon Soffer to "preserve Israel as an Island of Westernization in a Crazy Region", had as its public rationale the idea of defending Israel against terroristic attacks, but was designed at the same time to incorporate a large swathe of West Bank Territory, much of it private Palestinian land: 73% of the area marked for inclusion into Israel was arable, fertile, and rich in water, formerly constituting the "breadbasket of Palestine".

Had the barrier been constructed along the Green Line with the same purpose it would have run 313 kilometres, instead of 790 kilometres, and have cost far less than the $3.587 billion the extended wall is estimated to cost (2009). The disparity arises from the government's decision to rope in dozens of settlements west of the barrier. That it remains unfinished is said to be due to pressure from settler lobbies opposed to a completion that would restrict the further expansion of settlements or cut them off from Israel, as with Gush Etzion. There are only 12 gates through the 168 kilometres of the wall surrounding East Jerusalem, of which in theory four allow access to West Bankers who manage to obtain a permit. A whole generation of West Bankers have never seen the city, or the Haram al Sharif, a denial of international law stipulating the right of access to sites of worship.

=== Legal system ===
The Israeli-Palestinian conflict is characterized by a legal asymmetry, (Note: "legal asymmetry which probably most characterizes this conflict. From 1948 onwards, Israel has been a state with its own territory, internationally recognized borders, a clear political agenda, a defined foreign policy, and a powerful and well-organized army. In contrast, the Palestinians had to fight to move from the status of 'non-existence' – if not as 'refugees' — to recognition as a nation, with their own right to a national state. Also, during the years of the British Mandate (1922–1948), despite the fact that both Jews and Arabs were living in Palestine under British power, legal asymmetry was evident. Jews were recognized as a nation whose rights were guaranteed by the text of the Mandate, while the Palestinians were not. This asymmetry had not existed at the beginning of the conflict (1880–1920) when some Eastern European Jews started to immigrate to Palestinian territory, at the time under the sovereignty of the Ottoman Empire." (Gallo & Marzano 2009, p. 8)) which embodies a fragmented jurisdiction throughout the West Bank, where ethnicity determines what legal system one will be tried under. According to Michael Sfard and others, the intricate military system of laws imposed on Palestinians has enabled rather than limited violence. (Note: "it seems that more laws, arming to the teeth trailing troops of lawyers, legal advisors, judges and scholars, have not operated to limit state violence. Instead, more often than not, law has enabled this violence, cloaking the use of force required to sustain the Israeli regime with a mantle of legitimacy.") Down to 1967, people in the West Bank lived under one unified system of laws applied by a single judicial system. State law (qanun) is a relatively alien concept in Palestinian culture, where a combination of the Shari'a and customary law (urf) constitutes the normal frame of reference for relations within the basic social unity of the family clan (hamula). Settlers are subject to Israeli civil law, Palestinians to the occupying arm's military law. Overall the Israeli system has been described as one where "Law, far from limiting the power of the state, is merely another way of exercising it." A Jewish settler can be detained up to 15 days, a Palestinian can be detained without charges being laid for 160 days.

According to the legal framework of international law, a local population under occupation should continue to be bound by its own penal laws and tried in its own courts. However, under security provisions, local laws can be suspended by the occupying power and replaced with military orders enforced by military courts. In 1988, Israel amended its Security Code in such a way that international law could no longer be invoked before the military judges in their tribunals. The High Court upheld only one challenge to the more than 1,000 arbitrary military orders that had been imposed from 1967 down to 1990 and that are legally binding in the occupied territories. Israeli businesses in the West Bank employing Palestinian labour drew up employment laws according to Jordanian law. This was ruled in 2007 by the Israeli Supreme Court to be discriminatory, and that Israeli law must apply in this area, but as of 2016, according to Human Rights Watch, the ruling has yet to be implemented, and the government states that it cannot enforce compliance.

=== Freedom of movement ===
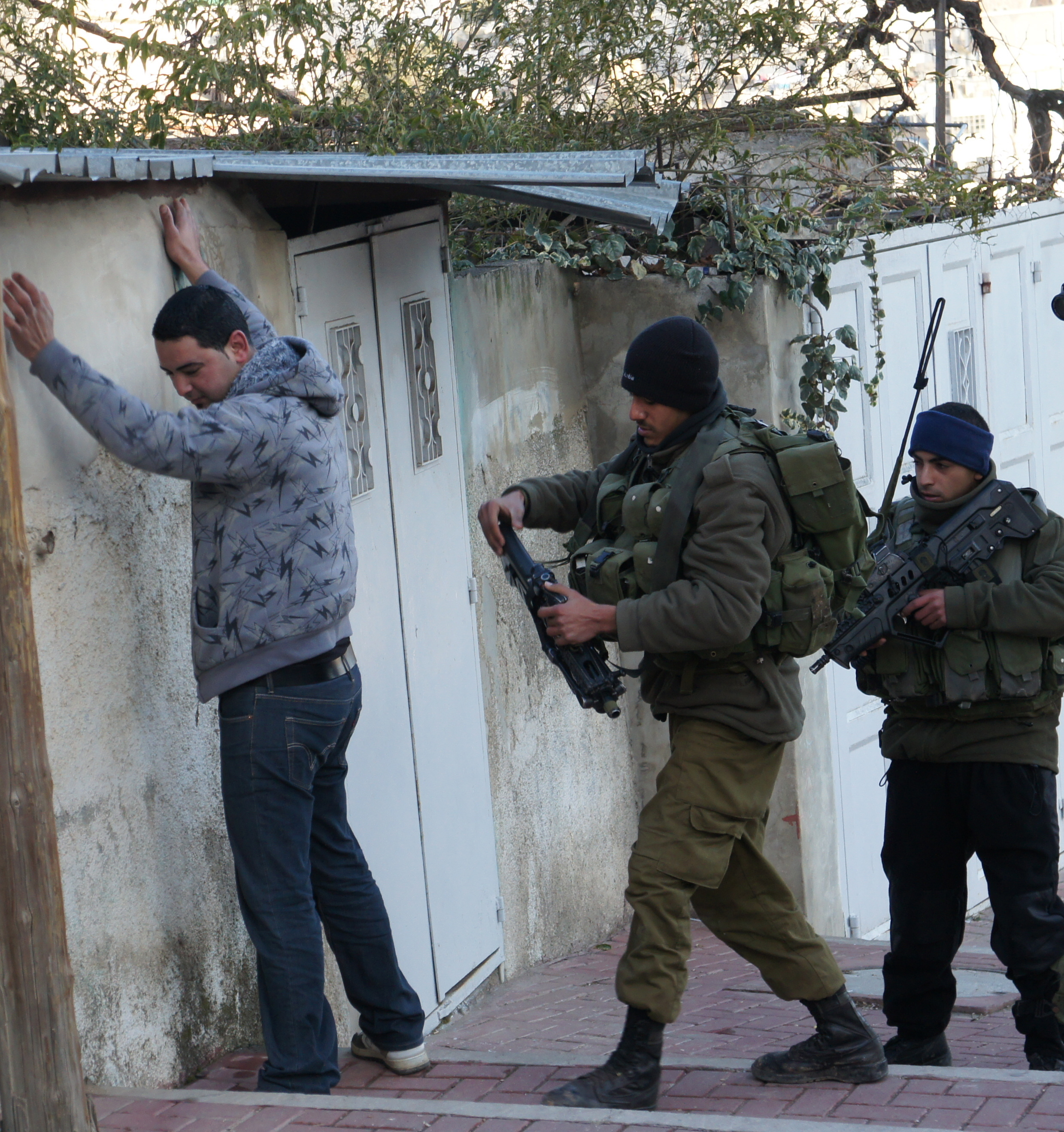
Routine check of a Palestinian man by Israeli soldiers at checkpoint in Hebron

The Universal Declaration of Human Rights establishes freedom of movement as a fundamental human right.

It has been said that for "Jewish settlers, roads connect; for Palestinians, they separate." Between 1994 and 1997, the Israeli Defense Forces (IDF) built 180 miles of bypass roads in the territories, on appropriated land because they ran close to Palestinian villages. The given aim was said to be to afford protection to settlers from Palestinian sniping, bombing, and drive-by shootings. Permanent and flying checkpoints (some 327 a month in 2017), barriers and restrictive networks restructure the West Bank into "land cells", freezing the flow of normal everyday Palestinian lives. TAU emeritus professor Elisha Efrat argues they form an apartheid network of "octopus arms which hold a grip on Palestinian population centres." A large number of embankments, concrete slabs, manned checkpoints, mounds, trenches, iron gates, fences, and walls impede movement on primary and secondary roads. The result was to cantonize and fragment Palestinian townships, and cause endless obstacles to Palestinians going to work, schools, markets and relatives. Women have died or had miscarriages while waiting for permission at a checkpoint to go to hospital. The World Bank that the impact of restrictions on movement for workers cost roughly US$229 million per annum (2007) while additional costs from the circuitous routes people must drive totaled US$185 million in 2013. In one village, Kafr Qaddum, soldiers from the Nahal Brigade planted explosive devices on a tract of land where demonstrators gather, as a "deterrence" measure: they were removed when a 7-year-old child was injured playing with one.

In February 2022, Israel issued a 97-page ordinance for implementation by 5 July. The document relaces a former 4 page guideline regulating entry and exiting Palestinian areas. Strict limits are imposed on foreigners, students, businessmen, academics, and, in general, Palestinians with dual nationality visiting families there. The tightening of movements is expected to have major negative repercussions on the local Palestinian economy. (Note: "There are no provisions at all for some common visa categories, including teachers and journalists working for Palestinian media outlets, as well as culture and tourism, and family visits by siblings, grandparents or grandchildren. Only 150 foreign students a year may enrol at Palestinian colleges and universities, studying pre-approved subjects, and there is a quota of 100 foreign 'distinguished' lecturers, a designation Israeli authorities will make." (McKernan 2022))

=== Village closures ===
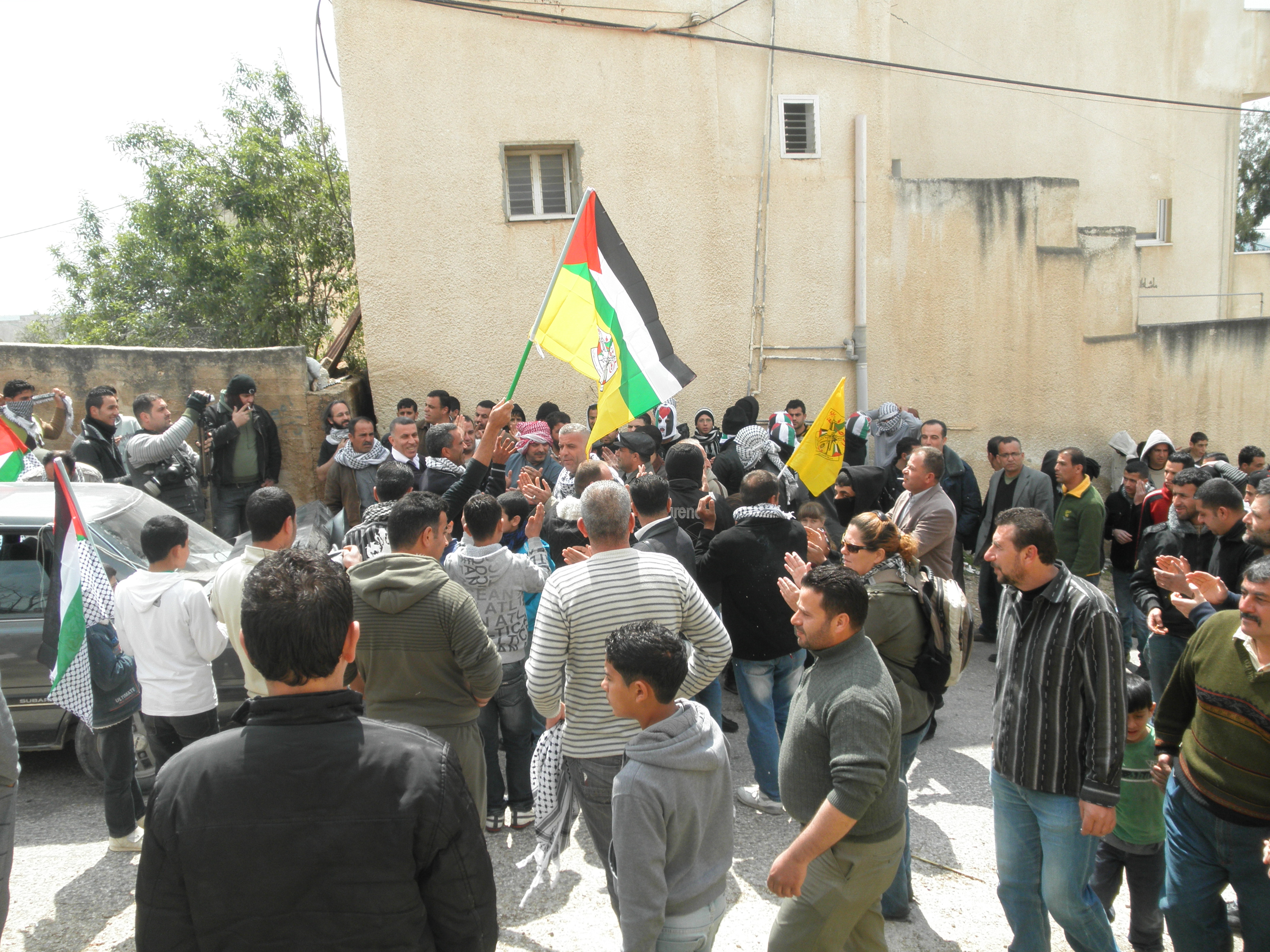
Demonstration against road block, Kafr Qaddum, March 2012

The closure (Hebrew seger, Arabic ighlaq) policy operates on the basis of a pass system developed in 1991, and is divided into two types: a general closure restriction the movement of goods and people, except when a permit is given, from and to Israel and the West Bank and Gaza, developed in response to a series of stabbings in the former 1993, and the implementation of total closure over both areas. Aside from general closures, total closures were imposed for over 300 days from September 1993 after the Declaration of Principles of the Oslo I Accord and late June 1996. The strictest total closure was put in place in the spring of 1996 in the wake of a series of the suicide bombings executed by the Gaza-Strip based organization of Hamas in retaliation for the assassination of Yahya Ayyash, when the Israeli government imposed a total 2-week long ban on any movement by over 2 million Palestinians between 465 West Bank towns and villages, a measure repeated after the deadly clashes arising from the archaeological excavations under the Western Wall of the Haram al Sharif/Temple Mount.

The IDF erected iron gates at the entrances to the overwhelming majority of Palestinian villages, allowing the army to shut them down at will, in minutes. Notable examples of villages that have undergone long term isolation, with residents suffering extreme restrictions on movement, are Nuaman, which was absorbed into the Jerusalem municipality while having its inhabitants classified as West Bankers, and Kafr Qaddum which has had a permanent roadblock at its entrance for 14 years, from 2003, the same time the settlement of Kedumim was established, and since 2011 its villagers have been protesting the roadblock, which requires them to travel a distance six times greater than the usual route to access Nablus.

Towards the end of the Gulf War in Kuwait, Israel again imposed a curfew on the West Bank (and Gaza) lasting seven weeks, causing devastating economic setbacks, with thousands of Palestinians fired from their jobs in Israel. Nablus was subject to total curfews for 200 days in two years (2002–2004). During house raids, windows and doors were smashed, food stocks mashed up into an indistinct mush; grain stores, TVs, solar panels, water tanks and radios destroyed or impounded.

It is routine for the Israeli authorities to impose a comprehensive closure over the West Bank during Jewish holidays like Yom Kippur, Pesach, Sukkot and Rosh Hashanah, with an exception made for Jewish industrial areas in the territory. The reason given is to prevent terror attacks, and also to enable security personnel at checkpoints time off to enjoy these holidays. Such closures can at times last 11 days.

=== Marriage difficulties ===
Coming to terms with the problem of the Palestinian right of return while negotiating for UN recognition in 1948, Israel came up with a family reunification programme, and was granted membership on the understanding that it would comply with international law in this regard. The very word "return" (awda) was censored from being used in Palestinian newspapers as implying an existential threat to Israel. In practice, Israel evaluates proposed family reunifications in terms of a perceived demographic or security threat. They were frozen in 2002. Families composed of a Jerusalemite spouse and a Palestinian from the West Bank (or Gaza) face enormous legal difficulties in attempts to live together, with most applications, subject to an intricate, on average decade-long, four-stage processing, rejected. Women with "foreign husbands" (those lacking a Palestinian identity card), are reportedly almost never allowed to rejoin their spouse. The 2003 Citizenship and Entry into Israel Law (Temporary Provision), or CEIL, subsequently renewed in 2016 imposed a ban on family unification between Israeli citizens or "permanent residents" and their spouses who are originally of the West Bank or Gaza. Such a provision does not apply, however, to Israeli settlers in the West Bank or (until 2005) Gaza. In such instances, the prohibition is explained in terms of "security concerns".

A Jerusalemite Palestinian who joins their spouse in the West Bank and thereby fails to maintain seven years of consecutive residence in East Jerusalem can have their residency right revoked. According to B'Tselem, any of the over 2,000 Palestinians registered as absentee owners of property in the West Bank have been denied permission to re-enter for purposes like family reunifications because their return would compel the Israeli authorities to return their property, on which settlements have been established, to their original Palestinian owners.

=== Targeted assassinations ===
Targeted assassinations are acts of lethal selective violence undertaken against specific people identified as threats. Rumours emerged in the press around September 1989 that Israel had drawn up a wanted list, several of whom were subsequently killed, and it was speculated that the time Israel might be operating "death squads". Israel first publicly acknowledged its use of the tactic against Hussein Abayat at Beit Sahour near Bethlehem in November 2000. In its decision regarding the practice, the Israeli Supreme Court in 2006 refrained from either endorsing or banning the tactic, but set forth four conditions – precaution, military necessity, follow-up investigation and proportionality (Note: In his study of the IDF Samy Cohen writes that: "In over 60 years of counterterrorism, warfare, little seems to have changed in the Israeli army mindset since the foundation of the state of Israel. In response to a terrorist threat or an insurgency, be it armed or unarmed, the IDF employs the same sort of response – disproportionate response – striking both combatants and noncombatants at once when it is impossible to strike one without hitting the other, with a certain degree of intentional excess, while trying to refrain from spilling over into mass crime..Disproportionate response is.. an essential component of Israeli strategic culture." (Cohen 2010b, p. 151))- and stipulated that the legality must be adjudicated on a case-by-case analysis of the circumstances. Nils Melzer found the judgement to be a step forward but flawed in several key regards, particularly for failing to provide guidelines to determine when the practice would be permissible. According to one former official, cited by Daniel Byman, on average Israel spends on average 10 hours planning a targeted killing operation and ten seconds on whether to proceed with the assassination or not.

Of the 8,746 violent Palestinian deaths registered from 1987 to 2008, 836 were executed following the identification of individuals based on information gathered from collaborators. According to B'Tselem, an Israeli human rights organization, for the period between 2000 and the end of 2005, 114 civilians died as the result of collateral damage as Israeli security forces successfully targeted 203 Palestinian militants. The figures from 9 November 2000 to 1 June 2007 indicate that Israeli assassinations killed 362 people, 237 being directly targeted and 149 bystanders collaterally. One intelligence officer recounting the atmosphere in the operations room where assassinations were programmed and then witnessed on video, stated that worries about "collateral damage" never dampened the cheers greeting a successful targeting mission.

=== Surveillance ===
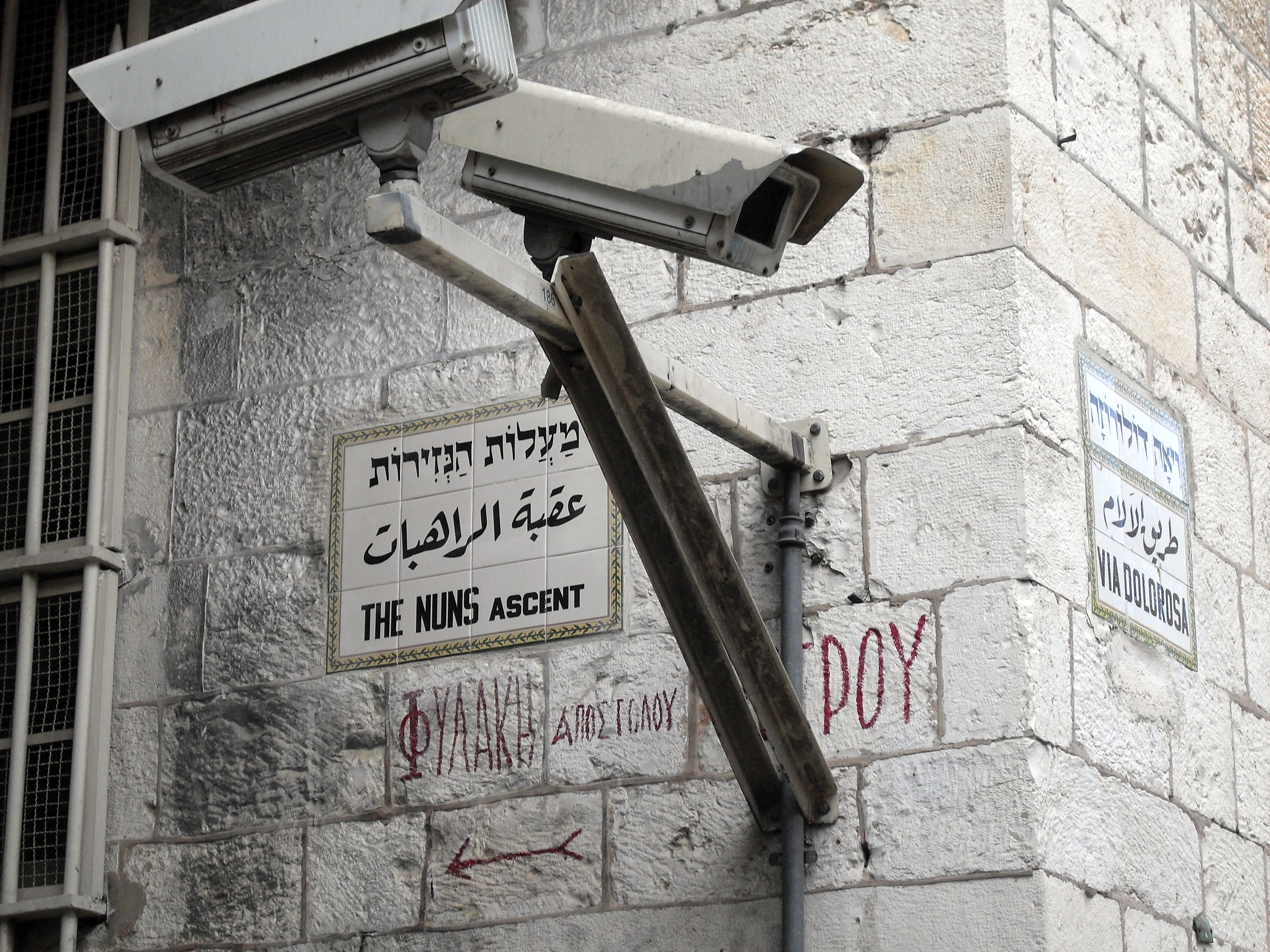
Cameras are ubiquitous in the old city, East Jerusalem

Israel, in its capillary monitoring of Palestinians, has been called a surveillance state par excellence. The entire Palestinian population is kept under surveillance, regardless of intelligence concerns, using smartphones and closed-circuit television (CCTV) cameras, some capable of seeing into homes, whose photos are then fed into the IDF's "Blue Wolf" tracking system, endowed with facial recognition technology. This is a pared down version of Wolf Pack, a computer data base containing "profiles of virtually every Palestinian in the West Bank, including photographs of individuals, their family histories, education and a security rating for each person." The deployment of such systems is banned in Israel. IDF soldiers on West Bank checkpoint duty are not allowed to end their shifts until they have filled their quota of 50 photos of Palestinians passing the checkpoint, and details concerning them. Settlers have a parallel smartphone app, White Wolf, for scanning Palestinians. On top of this, military drones and balloons, as well as the invasive Pegasus spyware developed by NSO Group for penetrating smartphones, form part of Israel's West Bank surveillance system. (Note: "In (Abu Markhyah)'s quarter of Hebron, close to the Cave of the Patriarchs, a site that is sacred to Muslims and Jews alike, surveillance cameras have been mounted about every 300 feet, including on the roofs of homes. And he said the real-time monitoring appears to be increasing. A few months ago, he said, his 6-year-old daughter dropped a teaspoon from the family's roof deck, and although the street seemed empty, soldiers came to his home soon after and said he was going to be cited for throwing stones." (Dwoskin 2021))

Among many Israeli critics of the occupation, the activist Jeff Halper and the philosopher Avishai Margalit express concerns at the paralysing effect on Palestinians of intricate surveillance systems, of a "matrix of control" underlying the occupation. Soon after hostilities ceased, Israel began to count all items in households from televisions to refrigerators, stoves down to heads of livestock, orchards and tractors. Letters were checked and their addresses registered, and inventories were drawn up of workshops producing furniture, soap, textiles, sweets and even eating habits. While many innovations were introduced to improve workers' productivity, they can also be seen as control mechanisms. Forward military planners in Israel foresee the day when Israel will withdraw from parts of the West Bank: this will not end the Occupation, for thereafter they envisage an "invisible occupation"/"airborne occupation" or "occupation in disappearance" régime, with a continued capacity to control the physically evacuated territory with surveillance and strikes.

One former Israeli intelligence officer involved in Unit 8200 likened the surveillance system to that in the German film The Lives of Others, with the difference, in his view, that the Israeli monitoring was more efficient. While the Israeli public thinks, he stated, that this surveillance is focused on combating terrorism, in practice a significant amount of intelligence gathering targets innocent people with no record for militancy. No Palestinian was, he claimed, exempt from non-stop monitoring. (Note: "All Palestinians are exposed to non-stop monitoring without any legal protection. Junior soldiers can decide when someone is a target for the collection of information. There is no procedure in place to determine whether the violation of the individual's rights is necessarily justifiable. The notion of rights for Palestinians does not exist at all. Not even as an idea to be disregarded." (The Guardian 12 Sep 2014)) Any information enabling "extortion" or blackmail, such as evidence of marital infidelity, health problems requiring treatment in Israel or sexual orientation is regarded as relevant. (Note: "If you're homosexual and know someone who knows a wanted person – and we need to know about it – Israel will make your life miserable. If you need emergency medical treatment in Israel, the West Bank or abroad – we searched for you. The state of Israel will allow you to die before we let you leave for treatment without giving information on your wanted cousin" (The Guardian 12 Sep 2014).) Israeli surveillance and strike presence over Palestinian areas is constant and intense, with former Shin Bet head Avi Dichter noting, "When a Palestinian child draws a picture of the sky, he doesn't draw it without a helicopter."

=== Technologies of control ===
Ben Ehrenreich, citing Gudrun Krämer's description of the British military suppression of the 1936 Palestinian Revolt, states that, aside from caning, all of the extreme measures adopted by the Mandatory authorities recur as standard practices in the way Israel manages the occupied territories. (Note: "house searches without warrants, night raids, preventive detention, collective punishment, caning and flogging, deportation, the confiscation or destruction of the homes of actual or presumed rebels, and in some cases even the torture of suspects and prisoners, and responding to demonstrations 'massive force..causing numerous casualties'. With the sole exception of caning, all of these tactics had, by the end of the Second Intifada, become standard practice in Israel's management of the occupied territories" (Krämer 2011, p. 274; Ehrenreich 2016, p. 33))

Scholars differ regarding how to classify the techniques of segregation and exclusion used to further Israeli control over the West Bank. For Jan Selby, there are five central planks to consolidate territorial colonization: (a) settlement construction; (b) land confiscation and engineering a bypass road network (c) drawing the local economy into dependence on Israel's larger one; (d) the creation of a dual legal system with different laws for Palestinians and Jewish settlers, with subsidies favouring the latter and (e) seeking local clients and patrons who would act according to Israel's bidding, and, in lieu of success in this regard, increased repression.

Gershon Shafir has discerned a matrix of five technologies of Israeli domination over Palestinians (a) the permit system; (b) administrative detention; (c) deportation: (d) house demolitions, and (e) torture. Richard Falk adds political assassinations, extrajudicial punishments and the use of collective punishment to the list. According to Neve Gordon, Israel uses lawfare "to encode the field of human rights and in this way (has) help(ed) frame human rights work in Israel as a security threat."

=== Population transfer and deportations ===
Israel was one of the High Contracting Parties to the Fourth Geneva Convention dealing specifically with protection of civilians in a war zone, and, as a signatory, underwrote Article 49 which reads:

Individual or mass forcible transfers, as well as deportations of protected persons from occupied territory to the territory of the Occupying Power or to that of any other country, occupied or not, are prohibited, regardless of their motive... The Occupying Power shall not deport or transfer parts of its own civilian population into the territory it occupies.

This final clause is absolute, allowing of no exceptions, and was ratified by Israel when it signed the Geneva Conventions on 6 July 1951. The sentence was written to prevent the repetition of the practice of colonization established by certain powers, by which Germany was to be understood, of transferring their population to conquered territories for political and racial reasons in WW2. Furthermore, Article 76 of that convention excludes deportation as a punitive measure in stating that

protected persons accused of offences shall be detained in the occupied country and, if convicted, they shall serve their sentences therein.

The principle is unambiguous – "an occupier cannot expel a single person, however much that person constitutes a security risk".

According to one estimate, between 1967 and 1978 some 1,151 individuals were deported by Israel, including two whole tribes, dispatched into exile en masse from the area of the Jordan Valley in December 1967 and May 1969. To provide legal warrant for these measures, which contravene the Fourth Geneva Convention, Israel applied law 112 going back to the British Mandatory government's Defence (Emergency) Regulations which predated the Geneva Convention by 4 years. These in turn went back to military emergency legislation devised to counteract the Palestinian war of opposition to British occupation and Jewish immigration in 1936–1939. (Note: "The Defence (Emergency) Regulations of 1945 have their origins in the State of Emergency Laws of 1936 and the Defence Laws of 1939 which were introduced by the Mandatory Authority in Palestine (British) to deal with the rising Arab opposition to both the continuation of the British Mandate and Jewish immigration to Palestine between 1936–1945." (AI 1978, p. 337)) Fathers were most frequently affected in the early days: sundering families, the practice was arrest household heads at night in their homes and take them to a desert south of the Dead Sea where they were forced, at gunpoint or gunshot, to cross over into Jordan.

For at least two years starting in mid-1970, Israel collected Palestinians from Israeli prisons and forced them across the Jordanian border in the Negev Desert. Codenamed Operation Patient, this practice expelled at least 800 people. The archives on the operation remain mostly unavailable to researchers.

To this day, any Palestinian Jerusalemite can have his or her residency revoked by Israeli law if Jerusalem has not constituted, in the view of the Israeli authorities, their "centre of life" for seven consecutive years, a revocation constituting a forced population transfer that has been applied to at least 14,595 Palestinians since 1967 (2016). The PLO, inspired by the precedent of the SS Exodus, once endeavoured to sail a "Ship of Return" into Haifa harbour with 135 Palestinians Israel had deported from the territories. Mossad assassinated with a car-bomb the three senior Fatah officials organizing the event in Limassol, and then sunk the ship in the port.

The forced transfer of Palestinians still takes place in the West Bank: in 2018 the Israeli Supreme Court gave the green light to expel the people of Khan al-Ahmar from their township to a rubbish dump outside Abu Dis. Israel arrested at a checkpoint in February 2017 Maen Abu Hafez, a 23-year-old Palestinian, since he had no ID, and detained him under a deportation order in a prison for aliens in Ramla, Israel. He had been raised since the age of 3 in the Jenin Refugee Camp. Israel seeks to deport him to Brazil, though he speaks no Portuguese, his mother is Uruguayan and his Palestinian father deserted the family to return to Brazil in 1997 and has not been heard from since. (Note: A representative from Israel's Ministry for the Interior explained that this West Banker lived in Israel and as an alien, must be deported: "Only the State of Israel is responsible for people residing in it and it has decided unequivocally, based on the deportation order against him, that he must return to Brazil" (Hass 2018b).)

=== Censorship ===
In the West Bank both the British Mandatory "Defense Emergency Regulations of 1945, No. 88" – stipulating that "every article, picture, advertisement, decree and death notice must be submitted to military censors" –, and "Israeli Military Order No. IOI (1967)", amended by "Order No. 718 (1977)" and "No. 938 (1981)" concerning "the prohibition of incitement and adverse propaganda" formed the basis for censoring West Bank publications, poetry and literary productions. The civil and military censorship bureaus could overturn each other's decisions, making publishing permits increasingly difficult. No clear guidelines exist however, so even works translated from the Hebrew press, or theatrical productions permitted in Israel, such as Hamlet, could be censored. Criticism of settlements was disallowed, as were sentiments of national pride. Obituaries mourning the dead, or expressing pride in the fallen could be challenged. Even mentioning the word "Palestine" was forbidden. Under Israeli Military Order 101, Palestinians under military law were prohibited from demonstrating and publishing anything relating to a "political matter".

Newspapers could lose their licenses, without any reason given, on the basis of 1945 Emergency Regulation (Article 92/2). Travel permits to enable notable Palestinians like Elias Freij, mayor of Bethlehem, to be interviewed abroad could be denied. Graffiti (shi'arati) protesting the occupation were prohibited unless approved by the military, and owners of walls were made responsible and fined for the graffiti, so the practice had to be banned by Palestinians since it became a large source of revenue for Israel. Recently, surveillance of the internet, using software to ostensibly identify potential threats in social media posts led to the arrest of 800 Palestinians both by Israeli units and PA security forces, with 400 detained as "lone wolf terrorists" for what they wrote, though none had carried out attacks and, according to security expert, Ronen Bergman, no algorithm could identify lone-wolf attackers.

=== Coercive collaboration ===
One of the first things Israel captured on conquering the West Bank was the archives of the Jordanian Security Police, whose information allowed them to turn informers in the territory for that service into informers for Israel. Collaborators (asafir), broken in interrogation, and then planted in cells to persuade other prisoners to confess, began to be recruited in 1979. The number of collaborators with Israel before the Oslo Accords was estimated at 30,000. According to Haaretz, Shin Bet has used a number of "dirty" techniques to enlist Palestinians on its payroll as informers. These methods include exploiting people who have been identified as suffering from personal and economic hardships, people requesting family reunification, or a permit for medical treatment in Israel.

=== Taxation ===
In international law no occupying power has the right to impose taxes in addition to those existing before the occupation. Under Military Order 31 of 27 June 1967, Israel took over the Jordanian taxation system, with a notable change: Israelis moving into settlements were exempt, being taxed under Israeli law, while by 1988, the high income tax rate of 55% for people with incomes in the 8,000 dinar bracket was squeezed so that it applied to those earning 5,231 JD. In Israel the 48% tax bracket applied to those who earned almost twice that amount.

In 1988 the affluent entrepreneurial Christian town of Beit Sahour, which had several hundred mainly family-run businesses, organized a tax boycott on the grounds they saw no benefits flow back from their taxes, basing their boycott on the principle of the American colonial revolt against their British masters, namely no taxation without representation. They refused to pay VAT and/or income taxes. 350 households of 1,000 were targeted and their bank accounts were frozen, while 500 more had their bank account confiscated or debited. Israel reacted with collective punishment, placing the town under a 42-day curfew. Residences were raided every day and business machinery, any equipment for commercial purposes, refrigerators, jewelry, money, household furniture and at times memorabilia, were confiscated. To shield soldiers from stone-throwing, cars were stopped and placed round the houses, while people were mustered to form human shields. The value of the goods confiscated bore no relation to the taxes being imposed, and were auctioned off in Israel at an estimated 20% of their replacement value. The effect was to virtually wipe out Beit Sahour's productive base.

== Collective punishment ==
Israel's use of collective punishment measures, such as movement restrictions, shelling of residential areas, mass arrests, and the destruction of public health infrastructure (Note: "The Palestine Red Crescent Society (PRCS) reported 174 documented attacks on their ambulances by Israeli soldiers and settlers between September 29, 2000, and March 15, 2002, resulting in the damage of 78 ambulances. There have also been 166 attacks on their emergency medical technicians (EMT), resulting in three deaths and 134 injuries among PRCS EMTs. Additionally, the PRCS headquarters in Al-Bireh was hit on several occasions by heavy machine gun fire from Israeli soldiers located at the nearby illegal Israeli settlement, Psagot." (Jamjoum 2002, p. 56)) violates Articles 33 and 53 of the Fourth Geneva Convention. Article 33 reads in part:

No protected person may be punished for an offence he or she has not personally committed. Collective penalties and likewise all measures of intimidation or of terrorism are prohibited (Note: Article 53: "Any destruction by the Occupying Power of real or personal property belonging individually or collectively to private persons or to the State, or to other public authorities, or to social or cooperative organizations, is prohibited, except where such destruction is rendered absolutely necessary by military operations." (Shahak 1974, p. 183))

Collective punishment of Palestinians also can be traced back to British mandatory techniques in suppressing the 1936–1939 revolt (Note: "The instability caused by the revolt was augmented by increasingly brutal measures taken during the British counterinsurgency campaign: emergency regulations, military courts, collective punishment, the demolition of houses (and indeed entire neighbourhoods), looting, revenge killings, and the like." (Likhovski 2017, p. 75)) and has been reintroduced and in effect since the early days of the occupation, and was denounced by Israel Shahak as early as 1974. Notoriety for the practice arose in 1988 when, in response to the killing of a suspected collaborator in the village, Israeli forces shut down Qabatiya, arrested 400 of the 7,000 inhabitants, bulldozed the homes of people suspected of involvement, cut all of its telephone lines, banned the importation of any form of food into the village or the export of stone from its quarries to Jordan, shutting off all contact with the outside world for almost 5 weeks (24 February – 3 April). In 2016 Amnesty International stated that the various measures taken in the commercial and cultural heart of Hebron over 20 years of collective punishment have made life so difficult for Palestinians (Note: When the Beit Hadassah settlement was established without Israeli government authority, a barbed wire fence to protect settlers was erected in front of the shops and all Palestinian shoppers had to be frisked before entering them (Playfair 1988, p. 410).) that thousands of businesses and residents have been forcibly displaced, enabling Jewish settlers to take over more properties.

=== House demolitions ===
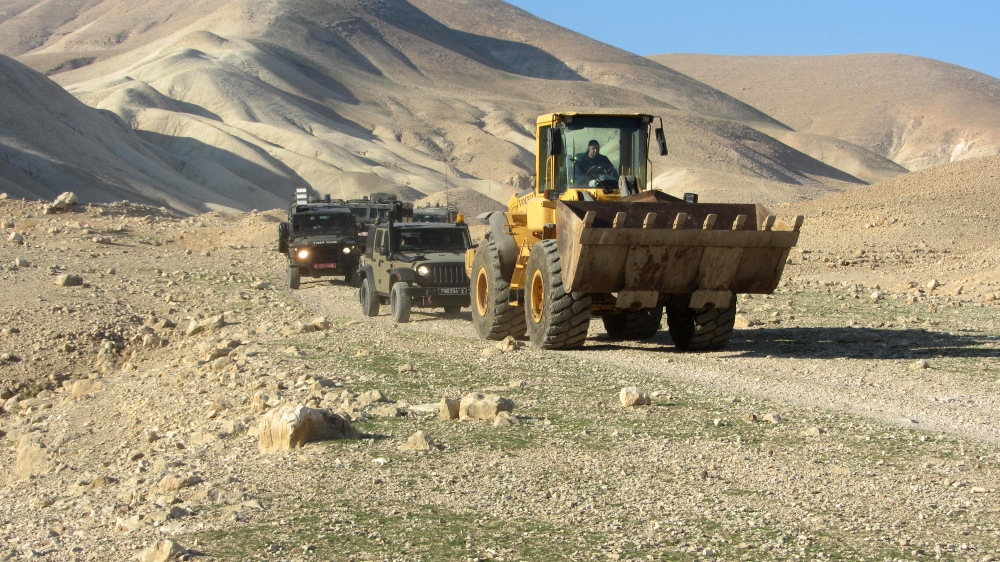
Israeli military forces arriving to demolish the Palestinian community of Khirbet Ein Karzaliyah on 8 January 2014, rendering homeless the entire population of 10 adults and 15 minors; the military returned a month later to demolish tents in which residents were living since the last demolition

House demolition is considered a form of collective punishment. According to the law of occupation, the destruction of property, save for reasons of absolute military necessity, is prohibited. The practice of demolishing Palestinian houses began within two days of the conquest of the area in the Old City of Jerusalem known as the Moroccan Quarter, adjacent to the Western Wall. From the outset of the occupation of the Palestinian territories down to 2015, according to an estimate by the ICAHD, it has been estimated that Israel has razed 48,488 Palestinian structures, with a concomitant displacement of hundreds of thousands of Palestinians.

Israel regards its practice as directed against houses built without Israeli permits or a form of deterrence of terrorism, since a militant is thereby forced to consider the effect of his actions on his family. Between September 2000 and the end of 2004, of the 4,100 homes the IDF razed in the territories, 628, housing 3,983 people were undertaken as punishment because a member of a family had been involved in the Al Aqsa insurgency. From 2006 until 31 August 2018, Israel demolished at least 1,360 Palestinian residential units in the West Bank (not including East Jerusalem), causing 6,115 people – including at least 3,094 minors – to lose their homes. 698 of these, homes to 2,948 Palestinians of whom 1,334 minors, were razed in the Jordan Valley (January 2006 – September 2017).

Even huts by shepherds, on which taxes have been duly paid, can be demolished. (Note: "An old man, Salim Id Al-Hathalin, grabs hold of me. He is waving papers – one a receipt from the tax authorities, confirming that he has paid taxes on the land he owns here in the village; the other a demolition order issued by the Civil Administration against his makeshift tent-cum-hut, which he points out to me as he cries: 'Why do they want to destroy my house? Where can I go? Can I go to America? I have nothing and they want to take that nothing from me. Can you help me? Where am I supposed to go?'" (Shulman 2018, p. 28))

According to the UN Office for the Coordination of Humanitarian Affairs (OCHA), between 1 January and 10 July 2026, attacks by Israeli settlers and the demolition of homes and other structures resulted in the displacement of more than 3,200 Palestinians across the West Bank. This equates to an average of 17 people displaced each day—double the daily average recorded over the preceding three years.

=== Permit regime ===
From 1967, almost every aspect of ordinary everyday Palestinian life was subject to pervasive military regulations, calculated to number of 1,300 by 1996, from planting trees and importing books, to house extensions. Military order 101 denied West Bankers the right to purchase any form of printed matter – books, posters, photographs and even paintings – from abroad (including from Israel) unless prior authorization had been obtained from the military. In the first two decades Palestinians were required to apply for permits and licenses for an enormous number of things such as a driver's license, a telephone, trademark and birth registration, and a good conduct certificate to secure jobs in numerous professions. Obtaining such permits has been described as a via dolorosa. The precise criteria to be satisfied for obtaining permits have never been clarified. It has been likened to the pass system of Apartheid. Zygmunt Bauman's warnings of the debilitating effect bureaucracy may have on the human condition has been cited to throw light on the Orwellian or Kafkaesque trap of red tape that, it is argued, places a stranglehold on Palestinian autonomy. There are 42 types of permits, depending on the purpose of one's movements, required by Israeli authorities as of 2018.

=== Impact on education ===
The high priority traditionally accorded education in Palestinian society continued over the early occupation, with, by 1979, Palestinians making up an estimated 10% of all Arab university graduates. Internal evidence from leaked reports in the 1960s suggest that improved high education for Israeli Arabs was thought at the time to pose a potential a security threat. (Note: Shin Bet chief Amos Manor warned that "educated Arabs could constitute a 'problem' and added, 'As long as they're half-educated, I'm not worried.'." (Raz 2021b)) Israel signed the International Covenant on Economic, Social and Cultural Rights in 1966, ratified in 1991. After 1967, Israel asserted that the right to education did not apply to the West Bank, East Jerusalem and Gaza, territories it held under occupation, since they lay outside Israel's sovereign borders.

During the first Intifada at one point Israel imposed a 19-month closure on all schools in the West Bank, including kindergartens, suggesting to at least one observer that Israel was intentionally aiming to disrupt the cognitive development of Palestinian youths. In the first two years of the Al-Aqsa Intifada, 100 schools were fired on by the IDF, some were bombed and others occupied as military outposts. In 2017, according to one estimate, Israel had issued either demolition or "stop work" orders affecting 55 West Bank schools.

=== Night raids ===
According to Major General Tal Russo, the IDF undertakes operations "all the time, every night, in all divisions." Israeli night raids are usually undertaken between 2 am and 4 am. The units, whose members are often masked and accompanied by dogs, arrive in full battle gear and secure entry by banging on doors or blowing them off their hinges. Surging blips in frequency may relate to rotation of new units into an area. Most occur in villages in close proximity to settlements. Such missions have several different purposes: to arrest suspects, conduct searches, map the internal structure of a dwelling, and photograph youths to improve recognition in future clashes. Laptops and cellphones are often seized, and, if returned, not infrequently damaged. Vandalism is commonplace, with looted objects given to needy soldiers or those on low pay, as in Operation Defensive Shield. Reports of stashes of money that go missing after a search are frequent. Many personal effects – photos of children or families, watches, medals, football trophies, books, Qur'ans, jewelry – are taken and stored away, and, according to one informant, intelligence officer trainees were allowed to take items of such Palestinian "memorabilia", called "booty", from storerooms. After international protests, in February 2014 a pilot scheme was begun to issue summonses instead of arresting children at night, and programmed to last until December 2015 The purpose of mapping raids is, reportedly, to work out how an area looks from Palestinian angles for future planning to enable an option for "straw widows" operations (mounting ambushes from inside those homes).

The practice by Israeli military units of raiding, making arrests in, and ransacking Palestinians homes deep in the night is a long-standing practice, persisting to the present day. In just three days over 21–23 January 2018, 41, 24 and 32 separate raids were made (Note: "Every week thousands of soldiers, flesh of our flesh, create these statistics, which our amnesia devours." (Hass 2018a)) In 2006 Israel made 6,666 raids inside the occupied territories. In the first six months of 2007, 3,144 Israeli search/arrest raids were made in the West Bank the parents of 90% of minors arrested, blindfolded and handcuffed in night raids, were given no explanation for the abduction, nor information about where the child would be detained. In another study, 72.7% of children studied had witnessed night raids, the traumatic experience coming second after watching scenes of mutilated or wounded bodies on TV. An extrapolation from this figure would, according to the NGO WCLAC, suggest that from the time martial law was imposed in June 1967 up to 2015, over 65,000 night raids had been conducted by the Israeli military on Palestinian homes in the West Bank (not including East Jerusalem).

A 26-year-old Palestinian man named Abdul Rahman Usha was fatally shot during an Israeli operation at the Fara refugee camp, located south of Tubas in the occupied West Bank, in November 2025, as reported by the official Wafa news agency.

=== Arrests and administrative detention ===
An estimated 650,000 Palestinians were detained by Israel from 1967 to 2005, one in three of all Palestinians in the first two decades alone. The military court system, regarded as the institutional centerpiece of the occupation, treats Palestinians as "foreign civilians" and is presided over by Jewish Israeli judges drew on prior British Mandatory law, where its application to Jewish activists was vigorously protested by the yishuv representatives. Four provisions entail (a) long detention of suspects incommunicado (b) without access to a lawyer (c) coercive interrogation to obtain evidence and (d) the use of "secret evidence". Over this period, tens of thousands have been subject to administrative detention, whose rationale is to incarcerate suspects who, in conventional criminal law, might not be convictable. Taisir al-Arouri, a Bir Zeit University professor of mathematics, was arrested at night on 21 April 1974 and released on 18 January 1978, after suffering 45 months of imprisonment without trial or charges being laid, only after Amnesty International issued a public protest.

The practice was considered by one scholar in 1978 as "an aberration of criminal justice" of a provisory nature. In 2017 Amnesty International, noted that "hundreds of Palestinians, including children, civil society leaders and NGO workers were regularly under administrative detention", and regards some, such as Khalida Jarrar and Ahmad Qatamesh, as prisoners of conscience.

=== Torture ===
States are obliged under the Fourth Geneva Convention to prevent torture, including mental suffering. According to Lisa Hajjar (2005) and Rachel Stroumsa, the director of the Public Committee Against Torture in Israel, torture has been an abiding characteristic of Israeli methods of interrogation of Palestinians. Torture can be of two types, physical and psychological. Reports of torture emerged in the 1970s, and began to be documented in detail by the NGO Al-Haq in the mid-1980s. The 1987 the Landau Commission examined some abuses and concluded "moderate physical pressure" was acceptable. The practice was then banned by Israel's High Court, barring case-by-case authorizations by the Attorney-General.

The Hebrew army slang term tertur is associated with policies introduced by Rafael Eitan, who ordered army troops and border police to engage in repeated arrests and the humiliation of large numbers of the Palestinian population in the territories. This refers to practices such as the wholesale roundups that took place whenever West Bank Arabs staged nationalist demonstrations. Israeli border police have been witnessed forcing Arabs to sing the Israeli national anthem, slap each other's faces and crawl and bark like dogs. The police have also arrested thousands of Arabs each year on "security" charges, which have ranged from outright terrorism to simply reading blacklisted books.

=== Children ===
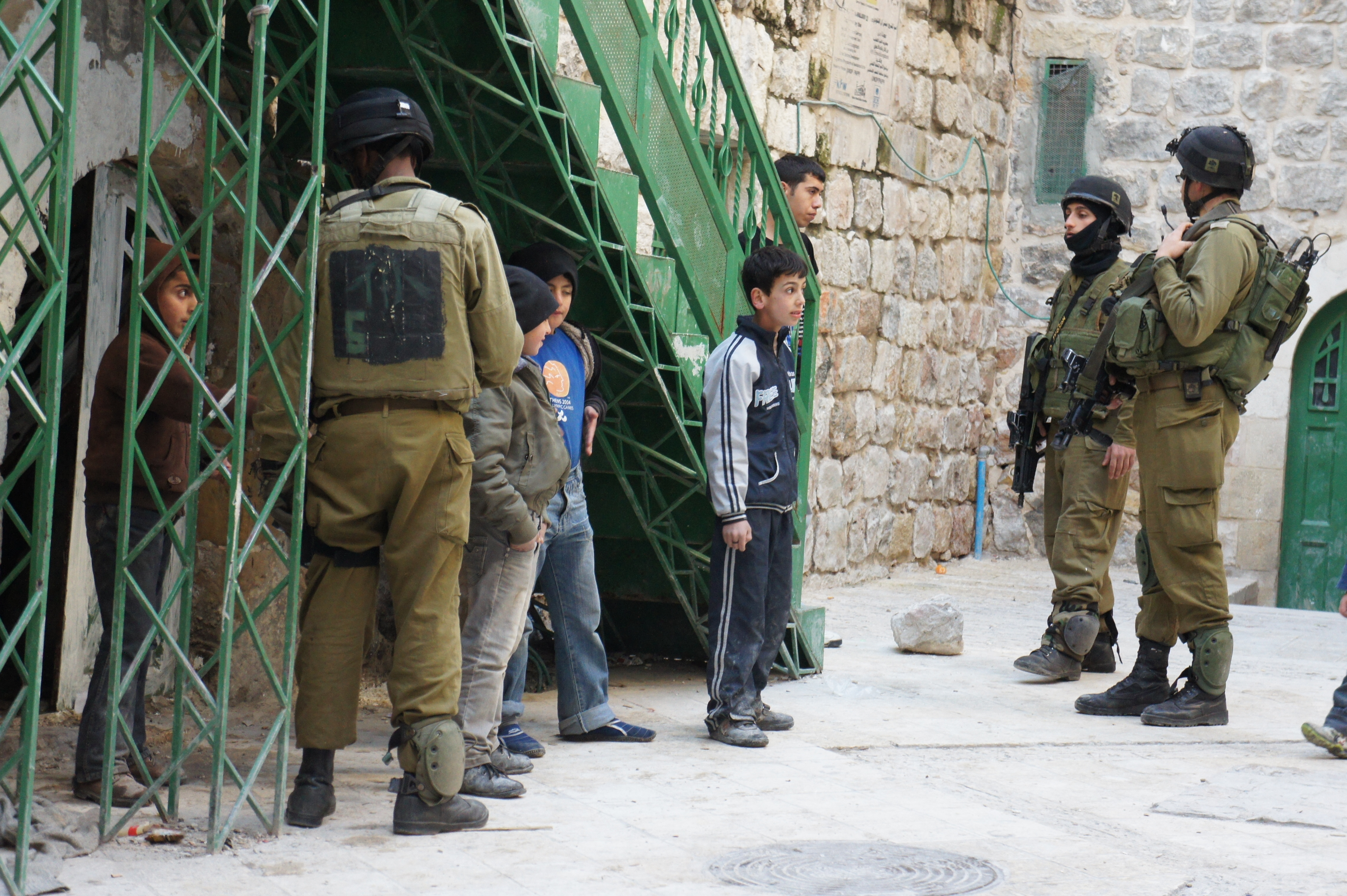
Children detained by Golani Brigade soldiers in Hebron

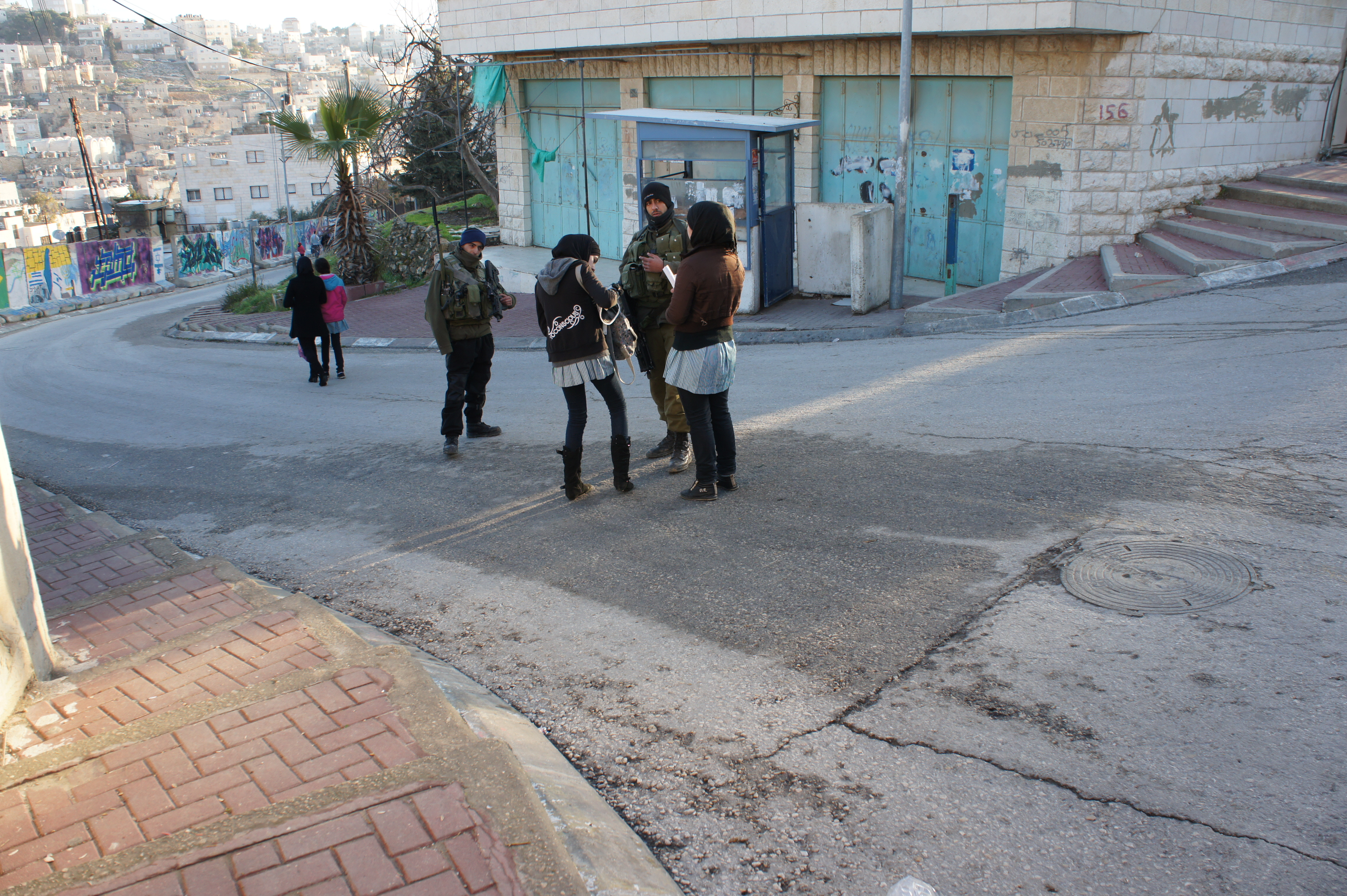
Palestinian girls having their school bags searched by Israeli soldiers in Tel Rumeida, Hebron

Documented incidents of Israeli forces targeting and killing Palestinian children date back to the earliest days of the conflict. Following the 1948 war, prior to Israel's formal occupation of the West Bank, border skirmishes between Israelis and Arabs were a regular occurrence with multiple cases involving Israeli soldiers shooting unarmed Palestinians, including children, dead. During the 1952 Beit Jala raid, 4 children ranging in age from 6 to 14 were killed by machine gun fire. During the First Intifada, Palestinian children regularly suffered serious, often fatal injuries. The First Intifada saw exceptionally high involvement by Palestinian teenagers, prompting Israel to declare stone throwing a felony under occupation law, a categorization that applied to children as well as adults and allowed for protracted incarceration of minors. Ill-treatment of Palestinian children in the Israeli military detention system appears to be widespread, systematic and institutionalized. According to a 2013 study by the United Nations International Children's Emergency Fund, covering 10 years of allegations of the mistreatment of children in Israel's military practices in the West Bank, though international law requires that all children in contact with judicial systems be treated with dignity and respect at all times, the evidence from multiple outside observers over a decade suggests Palestinian children under Israel military detention suffer cruel and degrading treatment. In law, the prohibition against such practices is "absolute and unconditional," and even security considerations or threats of war cannot override the rule.

Children constitute half of the Palestinian population, and though often construed as "mute victims or misguided puppets", they actively engage in the resistance, with some arguing that in doing so they forfeit their rights. (Note: "Though both Palestinian and Israeli children are victims of the conflict, Israeli Jewish children are seen as proper innocent victims of terrorism in contrast to Palestinian children who are often perceived as dangerous props of irresponsible parents, a conniving Palestinian Authority and desperate militant groups." (Sait 2004, pp. 211–212, 215)) According to James Graff, Palestinian children comprise a notable segment of Palestinians targeted, and can be included in categories from which they are normally exempted, and be singled out as a group to be subject to traumatizing violence, and targeted in random shootings, gassings and violence by soldiers and by settlers sponsored by the state.

According to the Swedish branch of Save the Children, between 23,600 and 29,900 children required medical treatment after suffering injuries from IDF beatings during the first two years of the First Intifada, a third of them aged 10 or under. Under Yitzhak Rabin's 19 January 1988 order to employ "might, power and beatings" and an interview in which he spoke of the need to "break their bones", (Note: Zeev Schiff, an Israeli military correspondent at the time, wrote: "The extent of the injuries caused by the new policy was harrowing. Considering that whole corps of soldiers were engaged in battering away at defenseless citizens, it is hardly surprising that thousands of Palestinians – many of them innocent of any wrong-doing – were badly injured, some to the point of being handicapped. There were countless instances in which young Arabs were dragged behind walls or deserted buildings and systematically beaten all but senseless. The clubs descended on limbs, joints, and ribs until they could be heard to crack- especially as Rabin let slip a 'break their bones' remark in a television interview which many soldiers took as a recommendation, if not exactly an order." (Gordon 2008, p. 157)) beatings, which until then had usually been a hidden interrogation method, went public, until an outcry arose when journalists filmed the tactic, a scandal countered by issuing a ban on media entering the territories in the spring of 1988.

Minors (16 years old and under) adding up to 5% of the child population constituted 35–40% of the 130,000 Palestinians who suffered serious injuries from Israeli troops in this uprising. (Note: For the first 3 years, from December 1987 to December 1990, the figure is 106,660 (Peteet 1994, p. 35).) Of 15-year-olds and under requiring medical treatment, 35% were injured by Israeli gunfire, 50% by beatings, and 14.5% suffered from tear gassing. From 2009 to 2018 Israel Security squads shot dead 93 Palestinian minors in West Bank clashes. In the period of the Al-Aqsa uprising, the ratios of those killed indicate that roughly 20- 25% were children on both sides, with the difference that Israeli fatalities were from incidents of body-bombing in which they were not the primary targets, whereas a substantial proportion of Palestinian children were killed by Israeli sniper gun-fire directed individually, according to Frank Afflitto. From September 2000-to December 2003, 109 children were killed by "one-shot wonders" in the head, 4 in the neck, and 56 by exclusive heart-chest shots. A further 90 were killed with two or three gunshot wounds. Overall, in the 3.25 years after the second uprising 427 children were shot dead by IDF forces and settlers.

== Resources ==
=== Agriculture ===
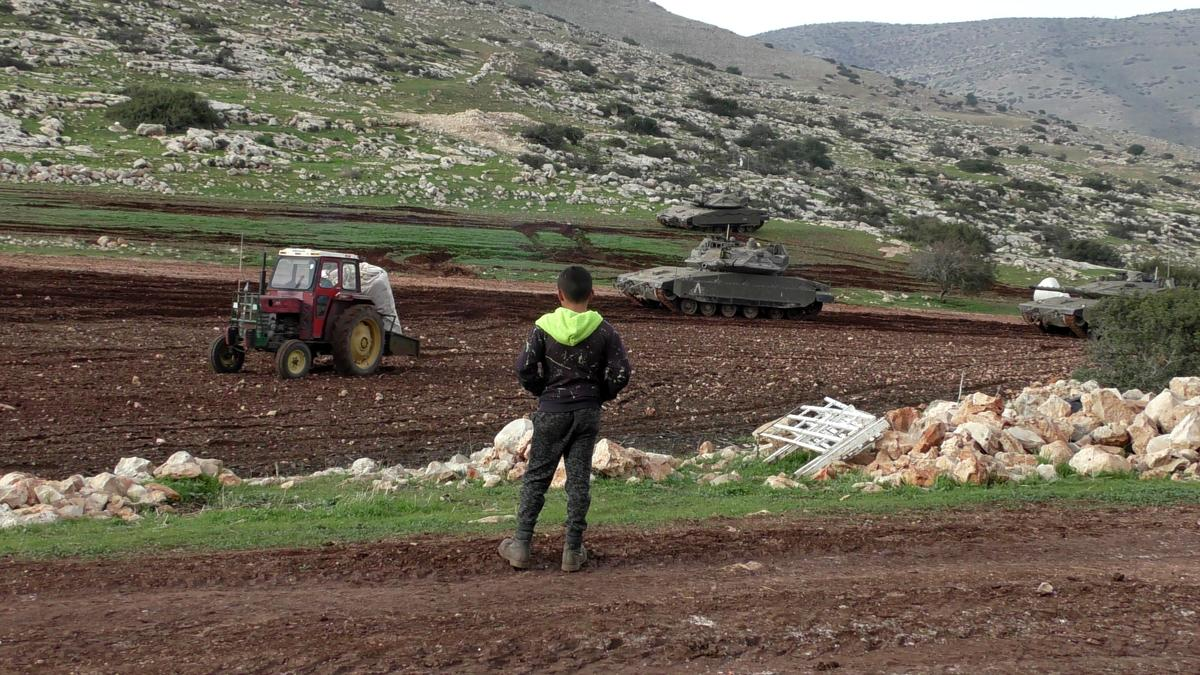
Training of Israeli tanks, damaging the fields of Ibziq Palestinian village, December 2021

The pastoral economy was a fundamental wing of the Palestinian economy. Of the 2,180 square kilometres (840 mi^{2}) of grazing land in the West Bank Israel permitted in the first years of the 21st century only 225 square kilometres (87 mi^{2}) for such use. In certain areas, such as the South Hebron Hills, Palestinian bedouin shepherds have their grazing lands disseminated with poison pellets that kill off their flocks, and require minute gleaning and disposal to restore the land to health. In Area C, nearly 500,000 dunams of arable land exist, Palestinian access to which is severely restricted while 137,000 are cultivated or occupied by Israeli settlements. Were the 326,400 dunams theoretically open to Palestinian use made available, the World Bank calculates, it would add $US 1,068 billion to Palestinian productive capacities. Another 1,000,000 dunams could be exploited for grazing or forestry, were Israel to lift its restrictions. The World Bank estimates that were Palestinian agriculture given access to better water resources, they would benefit by a boost in agricultural output of around $1 billion per annum.

After 1967, restrictions were placed on the types of fruit tree and vegetables that could be planted, and even the importation of tractors required an Israeli permit. Just after the occupation, a trial study carried out on Deir Dibwan's land, which is rich in underground water, concluded that it showed great promise as one of the best sites in the West Bank for growing oranges and bananas. An Israeli drilling permit could not be obtained, leading most of those involved in the project to emigrate to the U.S. Israel's control of land, water, trade and markets, and its specification and rigorous restrictions on what could be grown, is held responsible for the decline of agriculture as a share of West Bank GDP, and the drop of agricultural labourers in the work market from 46% to 27%, so that from 1993 to 1995 output declined by 40.12%. In the years directly preceding the Al Aqsa uprising (1998–1999) the IDF and settlers uprooted 21,705 trees throughout the West Bank and Gaza Strip. From 2000 to 2009, ARIJ estimated that 1,628,126 fruit trees in the West Bank and Gaza were destroyed or uprooted by Israel.

Destruction of agricultural goods was considerable during the second intifada. In the five months following its outbreak, 57,928 olive trees, 49,370 citrus trees, 22,270 stone-fruit trees, 11,514 date palms, 12,000 banana trees and 30,282 grapevines were uprooted. Olive oil production dropped 80% that year as a result. In the 15-month period from the outbreak, down to December 2001, the total damage was calculated as 155,343 olive trees, 150,356 citrus trees, 54,223 almond trees, 12,505 date palm trees, 39,227 grape vines, 18,400 banana trees, and 49,851 other varieties of tree. From September 2000 to December 2002, Israeli forces destroyed 14,196 forest trees. In the first two years, taking in the damage wrought by Israel in both the West Bank and the Gaza Strip, according to Cheryl Rubenberg, 667,000 trees were eradicated and 3,669,000 square metres of agricultural land destroyed. According to Palestinian authorities, the restrictive allocation of water to Palestinian agriculture has remained constant, at 84 million cubic metres per annum, since 1967. The Oslo Accords foresaw a supplementary 70–80 million cubic metres being supplied, but in two decades only about half of this additional supply had been provided.

The olive tree, aside from its economic function, is a symbol of Palestinian nationhood, of their quest for independence, much as the pine introduced by Zionist arboriculture. 15% of the territories – 45% of its arable land – is covered by olive groves, and is both a key resource, and its bimonthly autumnal harvesting a period of deep socioeconomic importance for families in most villages in the West Bank, for whom it provides roughly 40% (2009) of West Bank agricultural output. It has mopped up unemployment caused by job loss in Israel after the outbreak of the Second Intifada and the olive is known colloquially as shajara el-fakir (the pauper's tree), and regarded as holy (shajara mubaraka). (Note: "the Qur’an regards the olive tree as one of two trees blessed by Allah (the other is the fig)." (Braverman 2009, pp. 240–242)) Their uprooting by state agencies or settlers is an everyday occurrence in the West Bank.

Israeli officials see olive grove cultivation as "one of the best ownership techniques around". (Note: 1967. The legal norm that has had the most effect on the shaping of tree struggles in the West Bank is Article 78 of the Ottoman Land Code (1274 to the Hijra, the Muslim calendar). Put simply, Article 78 grants a long-term cultivator the right of adverse possession... Article 78 of the 1858 Ottoman Land Code states that "every one who has possessed and cultivated Miri land for ten years without dispute acquires a right by prescription [...], and he shall be given a new title deed gratuitously." (Braverman 2008, pp. 451, 455)) One Israeli official likened Palestinian olive trees to Palestinian children. They look naïve but several years down the track they turn into ticking bombs. (Note: "Like children, their trees look so naïve, as they cannot harm anyone- But like (their) children, several years later they turn into a ticking bomb." (Braverman 2009, p. 237)) The centrality of such olive groves for Palestinians is, according to Michael Sfard, viewed in the Zionist narrative as emblematic of "Arab laziness", since it grows alone and can be shaken down once a year to yield its wealth. (Note: In rabbinical tradition, felling olive trees is forbidden. The Beit El settlement's rabbi Zalman Melamed permits of only one exception, i.e. when they are known to serve as terrorist hideouts (Braverman 2009, p. 252).) In one analysis in 2006 it emerged that only 4% of complaints against settler trespass and destruction of Palestinian olive trees ever led to prosecution.

Following an Ottoman practice of uprooting olive trees to punish tax evasion, Israel began destroying groves, but with the expressed purpose of increasing security for settlements, and visibility for its internal West Bank road system servicing the colonial infrastructure. Construction of the Separation Barrier, erected predominantly on West Bank land, led to the uprooting of tens of thousands of olive trees. In just one village, Qafeen, the wall's route led to the uprooting of 12,000 trees of this variety, while alienating the inhabitants from their groves with a further 100,000 trees left on the Israeli side in a seam-zone, which they may access only once a year. (Note: Following scandals suggesting many of these removed trees were being sold underhand in Israel, with a 600-year-old olive tree earning a market price of $8,000, the IDF undertook to offer to replant them if the Palestinian owner could find other land for them (Braverman 2009, p. 247).) Aside from state practices, settlers have waged what one scholar terms "tree warfare" consisting in the stealing, uprooting, chopping or burning of native Palestinian olive groves, often as part of price tag operations. Of the 708,000 dunums of irrigable land in the West Bank only 247,000 dunums under aggregate irrigation, and it has been calculated (2009) the gross margin Palestinians forego touches close to $480 million per annum, roughly about 10% of GDP. The collateral effect of loss for potential employment runs close to (upper estimate) 10,000 jobs. The World Bank has observed that only 35 per cent of irrigable Palestinian land is actually irrigated, which costs the economy 110,000 jobs and 10 per cent of GDP.

=== Water ===
In the wake of 1967, Israel abrogated Palestinian water rights in the West Bank, and with Military Order 92 of August of that year invested all power over water management to the military authority, Military order 158 of November of that year required Palestinians to obtain a permit from the military authorities before developing any new water installation. As of 1996, no Palestinian had received a permit to drill a well since that date, by which time Israel drew a third of its fresh water and 50% of its drinking water, from the West Bank. According to Human Rights Watch Israel's confiscation of water violates the Hague Regulations of 1907, which prohibit an occupying power from expropriating the resources of occupied territory for its own benefit.

Palestinians have complained that their economy and agriculture are badly affected by the depletion of village waters in favour of supplying settlements. Israel placed restrictive policies on West Bank users. Differentials in costs of supply to Palestinians and settlements, which consumed 8 to 10 times what Palestinians were allowed, was blatant: settlements paid 0.5 New Israeli shekels (NIS), while Palestinian villages paid 1.8 NIS, per m3, with the former supplied daily, while delivery to the latter was limited to one or two days a week. "Blatant discrimination" exists in water pricing, allocation and delivery systems. Water consumption by Israeli settlers in the Territories is roughly eight to ten times that of Palestinians. Water is sold to Israeli settlements for 0.5 New Israeli shekels (NIS) per m3, while it was sold to Palestinian villages for 1.8 NIS per m3.

According to John Cooley, West Bank Palestinian farmers' wells were a key element behind Israel's post-1967 strategy to keep the area and in order to protect "Jewish water supplies" from what was considered "encroachment" (Note: "Keeping Tel Aviv, Haifa, and the other cities of the Israeli coastal plain from running dry depends on blocking Arab water development in the West Bank that could stop the aquifers flow westward: hence the ban on Arab wells." (Cooley 1984, p. 17))

By 2013, though some villages had only 15 litres per person, it was estimated West Bank Palestinians were supplied an average per capita 70 litres per day, as opposed to the 280–300 litres per person for Jewish settlers. Sometimes the contrast is starker: Al-Hadidiya's 20 litres per person versus the 431 litres per day consumed on the neighbouring Jewish moshav settlement of Ro'i, which draws 431 litres per person per day from a well it drilled on Al-Hadidiya land.

Israeli settlements have also pursued a practice of taking over for their own uses numerous springs belonging to Palestinian villages, appropriating them to create adjoining parks suitable to tourism. Palestinians are denied access.

=== Waste zone ===
Israel ratified the international Basel Convention treaty on Israel on 14 December 1994, according to which, any transfer of waste must be performed with an awareness of the dangers posed to the disempowered occupied people. It forbids the creation of "environmental sacrifice zones" in their midst. Israel, it is argued, has used the West Bank as a "sacrifice" zone by placing 15 waste treatment plants there under less stringent rules than those required in the Israeli legal system, thereby exposing the local people and environment to hazardous materials. The military authorities do not render public the details of these operations. These materials consist of such things as sewage sludge, infectious medical waste, used oils, solvents, metals, electronic waste and batteries.

Within Israel strict environment laws apply. Of 121 settlements studied in 2007, 81 had wastewater facilities, many subject to breakdown, with sewage flowing into streams affecting Palestinian villages nearby. Few pollution indictments result in action. Israel built four plants for Palestinian waste in the 1970s, of which only one was functioning in 2007, with Israeli budgetary problems being cited for the lack of adequate infrastructure leaving most Palestinian sewage untreated. The landfill near Al-Jiftlik in the Jericho Governorate, built on absentee Palestinian property without planning or an environmental impact analysis, is for the exclusive use 1,000 tons per day of waste produced by Israeli settlements and cities within Israel. Palestinians are restricted to three landfills, and permits for more have been denied unless the sites can be used to dump settlement garbage. Even if a permit is given without this agreement, settler waste is still dumped there under military escort.

=== Resource extraction ===
According to the Hague Conventions (Article 55) an occupying power may reap some value from the resources of the country occupied but not deplete its assets: the usufruct must benefit the people under occupation. The Oslo Accords agreed to the transfer of mining rights to the Palestinian Authority.

Israel has given concessions for 11 settlement quarries to operate. The World Bank estimates that 275 quarries could be opened in Area C, and that Israeli restrictions cost the Palestinian economy US$241 million per year. Palestinians are also denied permits to process Dead Sea minerals, such as bromine, about 75% of world production of which comes from this area, while Israeli firms such as Ahava do so and export to the EU. The latter restrictions are estimated to cost the Palestinian economy $642 million.

== Economic and social benefits and costs of the occupation ==
Many Israeli businesses operate in the West Bank, often run by settlers who enjoy the benefits of government subsidies, low rents, favourable tax rates and access to cheap Palestinian labour. Human Rights Watch claims that the "physical imprint", with 20 Israeli industrial zones covering by 2016 some 1,365 hectares, of such commercial operations, agricultural and otherwise, is more extensive than that of the settlements themselves. The restrictions on Palestinian enterprise in Area C cause unemployment which is then mopped up by industrial parks that can draw on a pool of people without job prospects if not in settlements. Some Palestinian workers at the Barkan Industrial Park have complained anonymously that they were paid less than the minimum Israeli wage per hour ($5.75), with payments ranging from $1.50 to 2–4 dollars, with shifts of up to 12 hours, no vacations, sick days, pay slips or social benefits. Many such businesses export abroad, which, according to Human Rights Watch, makes the world complicit in the settlement project.

Israeli policy aimed to impede any form of Palestinian competition with Israeli economic interests. The approach was set forth by Israel's then Defense Minister Yitzhak Rabin in 1986, who stated:

"there will be no development initiated by the Israeli Government, and no permits will be given for expanding agriculture or industry, which may compete with the State of Israel".

The World Bank estimated that the annual economic costs to the Palestinian economy of the Israeli occupation of Area C alone in 2015 was 23% of GNP in direct costs, and 12% in indirect costs, totally 35% which, together with fiscal loss of revenue at 800 million dollars, totals an estimated 5.2 billion dollars. Fiscally, one estimate places the "leakage" of Palestinian revenue back to the Israeli treasury at 17% of total Palestinian public revenue, 3.6% of GNP. A 2015 estimate put annual Israeli government expenditure on settlements at $US1.1 billion, though this is an inference given that the government does not report its settlement outlays. By 1982 subsidized Israeli agricultural productions and unhampered flow of Israeli manufactures hindered the growth of manufacturing industries in the Palestinian territories. High tariffs imposed by Israel on imports from countries outside the area of Israel meant Palestinian consumers had a choice of paying high prices for imported goods from foreign countries, or purchasing them from high-cost Israeli suppliers. Palestinian goods exporting to Israel were hit by tariffs, which down to 1991 earned Israel annually $1,000,000, but Israeli exports to the Palestinian territories were exempted from import duties. Since internal economic growth is hampered by Israeli restrictions, and, to compensate, 40% of the Palestinian economy relies on international aid, it is argued that such aid constitutes a subsidy to the occupation itself, making it "one of the cheapest occupations", for Israel. (Note: "These economic costs are partially paid by the international community's funds which are creating one of the cheapest occupations and relieve Israel from its duties and responsibilities as an Occupying Power." (Beckouche 2017, pp. 154–155, 154)) The Paris Protocol undersigned in 1994 allowed Israel to collect VAT on all Palestinian imports and good from that country or in transit through its ports, with the system of clearance revenue giving it effective control over roughly 75% of PA income. Israel can withhold that revenue as a punitive measure, as it did in response to the decision by the PA to adhere to the International Criminal Court in 2015.

A 2009 World Bank study concluded that "Very few economies have faced such a comprehensive array of obstacles to investment – not just of physical impediments to movement, but also comprehensive institutional and administrative barriers to economies of scale and natural resources, along with an unclear political horizon and the inability to predictably plan movement of people and goods".

=== Overall economic costs ===
A joint study by the Palestinian Ministry of National Economy and researchers at the Applied Research Institute–Jerusalem argued that by 2010 the costs of occupation amounted in 2010 alone rose to 84.9% of the total Palestinian GDP ($US 6.897 billion). Their estimate for 2014 states that the total economic cost of Israel's occupation amounted to 74.27% of Palestinian nominal GDP, or some $(US) 9.46 billion. The cost to Israel's economy by 2007 was estimated at $50 billion.

=== Indirect costs to Israel ===
In April 1968, Yeshayahu Leibowitz stated that were Israel to rule over millions of Palestinians, the nature of the occupation would compel it to become a Shin Bet state, with negative ramifications for its own institutions. (Note: "The state ruling over a hostile population of 1.4 to 2 million foreigners will necessarily become a Shin Bet state, with all that this implies for the spirit of education, freedom of speech and thought, and democratic governance. The corruption that is characteristic of all colonial regimes will also infect the State of Israel." (Rapoport 2024))

The indirect cost to the Israeli economy for defense outlays and maintaining operations in the territories has also been substantial. One analysis has concluded that the costs of maintaining Israel's occupation is a contributing factor to the rise of poverty in Israel, where poverty levels have jumped from one in ten families in the 1970s, compared to one in five at present. The high costs of subsidizing the settlement project shifted investment from Israel's development towns on its periphery and led to cutbacks in sectors like health care, education and welfare. (Note: Ruby Nathanzon of the Macro Center for Political Economy: "Imagine how much less poverty there could have been in Israel... There's a terrible distortion, an enormous economic cost in addition to the huge military burden." (Shauli 2007)) The settlement surge under Begin's Likud government was detrimental to housing development for Israelis in Israel: 44% of the entire budget of the Ministry of Housing and Construction in 1982 went to West Bank settlements. The substitution of imported foreign labour for Palestinians has also arguably lowered the bargaining power of Israeli blue-collar workers. In the aftermath of the Second Intifada, the budgetary allocations for Israel's social security net were reduced drastically: between 2001 and 2005 as defense outlays ratcheted up, child allowances were cut by 45%, unemployment compensation by 47%, and income maintenance by 25%. The annual growth, NIS 4.6 billion, in the defence budget for the decade 2007 onwards recommended by the Brodet Commission was close to Israel's total annual expenditure on higher education. Defense specialists also claim that guarding settlers lowers the combat readiness of soldiers, since they have far less time to train. It is also argued that the logic of settlements undermines Israel's rule of law. (Note: "the settlements systematically undermine Israel's rule of law. The project of settling the West Bank was based on flaunting Israeli law from the outset (the Passover feast held to stake a claim in Hebron, the settling of Sebastia, and later the proliferation of outposts that are illegal even under Israeli law). Forging documents, deceiving authorities, flagrantly breaching the law – all these are what made the massive land grab possible, along with the covert mechanisms for channelling taxpayer funds into the settlements far from the public eye." (Gordis & Levi 2017, p. 24))

=== Indirect economic gain to Israel ===
The high-tech security and urban warfare systems, and the surveillance devices developed while securing the occupation particularly during the Al-Aqsa Intifada, have turned Israel into one of the major exporters of such systems in the world. Israel has become a pioneering leader in the manufacture of drones, border surveillance sensors, with the commercial advantage of having these devices "battle-tested" in the "laboratories" of the occupied territory.

=== Integration of East Jerusalem ===
Arab residents of East Jerusalem are increasingly becoming integrated into Israeli society, in terms of education, citizenship, national service and in other aspects. Trends among East Jerusalem residents have shown: increasing numbers of applications for an Israeli ID card; more high school students taking the Israeli matriculation exams; greater numbers enrolling in Israeli academic institutions; a decline in the birthrate; more requests for building permits; a rising number of East Jerusalem youth volunteering for national service; a higher level of satisfaction according to polls of residents and increased Israeli health services. According to David Pollock, a senior fellow at The Washington Institute for Near East Policy, in the hypothesis that a final agreement was reached between Israel and the Palestinians with the establishment of a two-state solution, 48% of East Jerusalem Arabs would prefer being citizens of Israel, while 42% of them would prefer the State of Palestine and 9% would prefer Jordanian citizenship.

=== Communications ===
Under the Oslo Accords, Israel agreed that the Palestinian territories had a right to construct and operate an independent communications network. In 2016 a World Bank analysis concluded the provisions of this agreement had not been applied, causing notable detrimental effects to Palestinian development. It took 8 years for Israel to agree to a request for frequencies for 3G services, though they were limited, causing a bottleneck which left Israeli competitors with a distinct market advantage. The local Wataniya mobile operator's competitiveness suffered from Israeli restrictions and delays, and illegal Israeli operators in the West Bank, with 4G services available by that date, still maintained an unfair advantage over Palestinian companies. Israel imposes three other constraints that hamper Palestinian competitiveness: restrictions are imposed on imports of equipment for telecom and ICT companies, and movement to improve the development and maintenance of infrastructure in Area C, and finally, Palestinian telecommunications accessing international links must go through companies with Israeli registration. From 2008 to 2016, they concluded, progress in negotiating resolutions to these problems had been "very slim".

=== Tourism ===
The West Bank is a key attraction for pilgrims and tourists and has a rich heritage of deep significance for members of the Abrahamic religions. After 1967 the loss of East Jerusalem cut off potential gains to the West Bank economy from tourism. From 92 to 94 cents in every dollar of the tourist trade goes to Israel, which exercises a virtual monopoly. Israel controls all access points to the major tourist attractions in East Jerusalem, Bethlehem and Jericho, and Palestinian hotels in most West Bank areas remain half-empty.

Israeli obstacles make Palestinian recreational access to, or development of tourist infrastructure around, the Dead Sea difficult. The World Bank estimates that $126 million annually and 2,900 jobs would accrue to the local economy if Palestinians were allowed to operate on similar terms available to Israel entrepreneurs. Palestinians have been blocked at checkpoints from beaches there putatively because their presence would harm Israeli tourist businesses.

=== Cultural impact ===
Many studies, following the work of Daniel Bar-Tal and Gavriel Salomon, have analyzed the emergence and consolidation of an "ethos of conflict", one of what they see as three key components of Israeli Jewish society – the others being collective memory of the conflict and collective emotional orientations – which have developed to cope with the stress of an intractable conflict. This complex can be broken down into eight societal values informing a unilateral outlook: (a) The justice of Israel's cause; (b) Security (including national survival) (c) Positive collective ethnocentric in-group images; (d) One's Own Victimization; (e) Delegitimizing the adversary by denying their humanity, allowing one to harm them; (f) Patriotism; (g) Beliefs reinforcing social solidarity, by ignoring internal disagreements; (h) Belief that peace is the goal. Recent research suggests that four of these – the persistence of a sense of historic trauma and an ethos of conflict (delegitimization of the opponent, security, own victimization and justness of one's own goals) – consistently influence decision-making on the conflict in the Israeli Supreme Court itself. The same model has been applied to Palestinian society, emphasizing that of all themes patriotism in the form of mūqāwama (resistance and readiness for self-sacrifice) form the keynote of Palestinian identity.

=== Loss of cultural property ===
The Israeli Antiquities Law of 1978 foresaw expropriations of any site necessary for preservation, excavation or research. The military administration can confiscate Palestinian land on or near such sites, deny their owners' building permits while at times, such areas are open to Israeli settlement. Under the Hague Convention of 1954 an occupying power may not remove material from the occupied country. In 2019 the Israeli High Court ruled that Israeli archaeological work in the West Bank may be kept off the public record. In 2019 alone, Israel made 119 demolition orders and warnings to desist from "destroying antiquities" in the West Bank, a rise of 162% over preceding years. Regavim's Shomrim Al Hanetzach ("guarding eternity") lobbies for such orders against what they call a "quiet Isis", though many affected families and villagers are unaware of any archaeological material on their land, and these zones encompass areas far larger than the actual known archaeological remains at their centre.

Albert Glock, among others, argued that the thrust of archaeology has been to interpret the Palestinian past in Christian and Jewish Zionist terms, in the latter instance, providing a charter for the occupation, to the detriment of the Palestinian cultural heritage. Many sites with dual cultural value have been wrested from Palestinian control, such as the Herodium, Joseph's Tomb in Nablus, the Cave of the Patriarchs in Hebron, Rachel's Tomb the Tomb of Jesse and Ruth in Tel Rumeida, Hebron and at Qumran near the Palestinian village of Shuqba there is a garbage dump for settlement waste. Many Palestinian heritage sites within the West Bank have been added to the Jewish heritage list. Aside from the destruction of villages, in Jerusalem and elsewhere, significant losses were incurred by the expropriation of libraries with extensive historical resources regarding Palestine's Arabic past.

== Media coverage and bias ==
Bias in coverage of the conflict has been debated from multiple sides, with Peter Beinart criticizing an "Orwellian" usage of euphemisms, and others have decried the use of "sanitized terminology".

Each party has its preferred set of descriptive words. International usage speaks of the West Bank, whereas Israeli usage prefers "Judea and Samaria", evoking the Biblical names for much of the territory, and governs it, excepting East Jerusalem, under the Israeli district name of Judea and Samaria Area; Israeli settlements are called "colonies" or "neighbourhoods" depending on the viewpoint. Violence by Palestinians is regularly labeled terrorism by Israel, whereas Israeli military actions are reported as "retaliation" for Palestinian attacks, and the context for those attacks is often disregarded, lending credence to the idea Israel never initiates violence. (Note: "Lowstedt and Madhoun 2003 found that the term 'retaliation' was used to describe Israeli attacks while information about events preceding Palestinians' violent actions tended to be omitted (Philo and Berry, 2004 160–164, 177), and this helped strengthen the plausibility to the dominant narrative, which is that Israel only retaliates against Palestinian violence in self-defence, and never initiates it." (Tiripelli 2016, p. 24))

In university settings, organizations like Campus Watch closely report and denounce what they consider "anti-Israeli" attitudes. Academics like Sara Roy have argued on the other hand that "the climate of intimidation and censorship surrounding the Israeli-Palestinian conflict, both inside (at all levels of the education hierarchy) and outside the U.S. academy, is real and longstanding". Attempts have been made to silence several high-profile critics of Israeli policies in the territories, among them Tony Judt, Norman Finkelstein, Joseph Massad, Nadia Abu El-Haj and William I. Robinson, prompting concerns that the political pressures circumscribing research and discussion undermine academic freedom.

Both Israeli and Palestinian local press coverage, reflecting the views of the political and military establishment, has traditionally been conservative. Tamar Liebes has argued that Israeli "journalists and publishers see themselves as actors within the Zionist movement, not as critical outsiders". The growth of the Internet has introduced controversy regarding images of dead or wounded Palestinians, with some proven to be fake and many more alleged to be fraudulent manipulations, with pro-Israeli views that "Arabs are liars by nature" being accepted as a given to dismiss imagery of Palestinian casualties.

== See also ==
- Israeli-occupied territories
- Israeli occupation of the Gaza Strip
- Israeli apartheid
- List of Israeli settlements

== Sources ==
- "A2. European Union, Internal Report on "Area C and Palestinian State Building," Brussels, January 2012 (excerpts)". Journal of Palestine Studies. 41 (3): 220–223. Spring 2012. doi:10.1525/jps.2012.xli.3.220. JSTOR 10.1525/jps.2012.xli.3.220.
- Abdulhadi, Rami S. (Summer 1990). "Land Use Planning in the Occupied Palestinian Territories". Journal of Palestine Studies. 19 (4): 46–63. doi:10.2307/2537388. JSTOR 2537388. S2CID 154217234.
- Abdullah, Daud (28 August 2017). "Education is a right being denied to Palestinian children, and Israel is the culprit". MEMO.
- Adam, Heribert; Moodley, Kogila (2005). Seeking Mandela: Peacemaking Between Israelis and Palestinians. Temple University Press. ISBN 978-1-59213-399-4.
- "Advisory proceedings: pending cases". International Court of Justice.
- Afflitto, Frank M. (2007). "Of Guns, Children, and the Maelstrom: Determining Purposive Action in Israeli-Perpetrated Firearm Deaths of Palestinian Chuildren and Minors". In Springwood, Charles Fruehling (ed.). Open Fire: Understanding Global Gun Cultures. Berg Publishers. pp. 42–54. ISBN 978-1-845-20417-4.
- Aharony, Michal (15 November 2018). "Is It Possible to Recover From Torture? Lessons From Holocaust Survivor and Philosopher Jean Améry". Haaretz.
- Ahronheim, Anna (2 October 2017). "Israel to impose 11-day closure of West Bank and Gaza for Sukkot holiday". The Jerusalem Post.
- Allabadi, Fadwa; Hardan, Tareq (2016). "Marriage, Split Residency, and the Separation Wall in Jerusalem". Jerusalem Quarterly (65). Institute for Palestine Studies: 69–85. doi:10.70190/jq.I65.p69.
- Aloni, Adam (December 2017). Made in Israel: Exploiting Palestinian Land for Treatment of Israeli Waste (PDF). B'Tselem. ISBN 978-965-7613-31-3.
- Amnesty International (Summer 1978). "Amnesty International Administrative Detention in Israel/Occupied Territories". Middle East Journal. 32 (3): 337–339. JSTOR 4325772.
- Anthony, C. Ross; Egal, Daniel; Ries, Charles P.; Bond, Craig A.; Liepman, Andrew M.; Martini, Jeffrey; et al. (2015). The Costs of the Israeli-Palestinian Conflict (PDF). RAND Corporation. ISBN 978-0-833-09033-1.
- "Any Palestinian is exposed to monitoring by the Israeli Big Brother". The Guardian. 12 September 2014.
- Bahbah, Bishara A.; Butler, Linda (1986). Israel and Latin America: The Military Connection. Macmillan Publishers. ISBN 978-1-349-09193-5.
- Bar-Siman-Tov, Yaacov (2007). "Dialectic Between Conflict Management and Conflict Resolution". In Bar-Siman-Tov, Yaacov (ed.). The Israeli-Palestinian Conflict: From Conflict Resolution to Conflict Management. Springer. pp. 9–39. ISBN 978-0-230-60311-0.
- Bar-Tal, Daniel; Alon, Ilai (2017). "Sociopsychological approach to Trust (or Distrust): Concluding Comments". In Bar-Tal, Daniel (ed.). The Role of Trust in Conflict Resolution: The Israeli-Palestinian Case and Beyond. Springer. pp. 311–333. ISBN 978-3-319-43355-4.
- Bar-Tal, Daniel; Salomon, Gavriel (2006). "Israeli-Jewish Narratives of the Israeli-Palestinian Conflict: Evolution, Contents, Functions and Consequences". In Rotberg, Robert I. (ed.). Israeli and Palestinian Narratives of Conflict: History's Double Helix. Indiana University Press. pp. 19–45. ISBN 978-0-253-21857-5.
- Baxendale, Sidney J. (Spring 1989). "Taxation of Income in Israel and the West Bank: A Comparative Study". Journal of Palestine Studies. 18 (3): 134–141. doi:10.2307/2537347. JSTOR 2537347.
- Beaumont, Peter (19 July 2024). "Why ICJ ruling against Israel's settlement policies will be hard to ignore". The Guardian.
- Beckouche, Pierre (2017). "Occupied Palestinian Territory". Europe's Mediterranean Neighbourhood. Edward Elgar Publishing. pp. 146–156. ISBN 978-1-786-43149-3.
- Beinart, Peter (12 February 2014). "George Orwell and Israel's 'Democratic' Occupation of the West Bank". Haaretz.
- Beinin, Joel (2004). "The New McCarthyism: Policing Thought about the Middle East". Race & Class. 46 (1): 101–115. doi:10.1177/0306396804045517. S2CID 143636285.
- Ben-Naftali, Orna; Gross, Aeyal M.; Michaeli, Keren (2005). "Illegal Occupation: Framing the Occupied Palestinian Territory" (PDF). Berkeley Journal of International Law. 23: 551.
- Ben-Naftali, Orna; Sfard, Michael; Viterbo, Hedi (2018). The ABC of the OPT: A Legal Lexicon of the Israeli Control over the Occupied Palestinian Territory. Cambridge University Press. ISBN 978-1-107-15652-4.
- Ben-Simhon, Coby (20 September 2012). "Revealed: Israeli Taxpayers Helped Bankroll Illegal West Bank Outposts for Decades". Haaretz. Archived from the original on 24 January 2018.
- Benvenisti, Eyal (2012). The International Law of Occupation. Oxford University Press. ISBN 978-0-199-58889-3.
- Benvenisti, Eyal; Zamir, Eyal (April 1995). "Private Claims to Property Rights in the Future Israeli-Palestinian Settlement". The American Journal of International Law. 89 (2): 295–340. doi:10.2307/2204205. JSTOR 2204205. S2CID 145317224.
- Berg, Raffi (19 July 2024). "ICJ says Israeli occupation of Palestinian territories is illegal". BBC News.
- Berger, Yotam (15 June 2017). "How Many Settlers Really Live in the West Bank? Haaretz Investigation Reveals". Haaretz.
- Berger, Yotam (22 October 2018). "Revealed: Israeli Taxpayers Helped Bankroll Illegal West Bank Outposts for Decades". Haaretz.
- Bergman, Ronen (2018). Rise and Kill First: The Secret History of Israel's Targeted Assassinations. Random House. ISBN 978-0-679-60468-6.
- Berkes, Heidrun (2016). Economic development under occupation: A case study of the dairy sector in the Hebron governorate (PDF) (Thesis). Leiden University.
- Berman, Aaron (1992). Nazism, the Jews and American Zionism, 1933–1988. Wayne State University Press. ISBN 978-0-814-32232-1.
- Berman, Lazar (21 October 2022). "UN report denounces Israel's 'unlawful occupation,' demands prosecution of officials". The Times of Israel. Associated Press.
- Bhavnani, Ravi; Miodownik, Dan; Choi, Hyun Jin (2011a). "Three Two Tango: Territorial Control and Selective Violence in Israel, the West Bank, and Gaza". The Journal of Conflict Resolution. 55 (1): 133–158. doi:10.1177/0022002710383663. JSTOR 25780770. S2CID 146164752.
- Bhavnani, Ravi; Miodownik, Dan; Choi, Hyun Jin (2011b). "Violence and Control in Civil Conflict: Israel, the West Bank, and Gaza". Comparative Politics. 44 (1): 61–80. doi:10.5129/001041510X13815229366561. JSTOR 23040658.
- Bishara, Amahl (2010). "Weapons, Passports, and News: Palestinian Perceptions of U.S. Power as a Mediator of War". In Kelly, John D; Jauregui, Beatrice; Mitchell, Sean T.; Walton, Jeremy (eds.). Anthropology and Global Counterinsurgency. University of Chicago Press. pp. 125–136. ISBN 978-0-226-42995-3.
- Bisharat, George Emile (2012). Palestinian Lawyers and Israeli Rule: Law and Disorder in the West Bank. University of Texas Press. ISBN 978-0-292-73984-0.
- Black, Ian (2017). Enemies and Neighbours: Arabs and Jews in Palestine and Israel, 1917-2017. Penguin UK. ISBN 978-0-241-00443-2.
- Bowker, Robert P. (2003). Palestinian Refugees: Mythology, Identity, and the Search for Peace. Lynne Rienner Publishers. ISBN 978-1-588-26202-8.
- Braverman, Irus (September 2008). ""The Tree Is the Enemy Soldier": A Sociolegal Making of War Landscapes in the Occupied West Bank". Law & Society Review. 42 (3): 449–482. doi:10.1111/j.1540-5893.2008.00348.x. JSTOR 29734134. SSRN 1307044.
- Braverman, Irus (November 2009). "Uprooting Identities: The Regulation of Olive Trees in the Occupied West Bank". Political and Legal Anthropology Review. 32 (2): 237–264. doi:10.1111/j.1555-2934.2009.01061.x. JSTOR 24497464.
- Bregman, Ahron (2014). Cursed Victory: A History of Israel and the Occupied Territories. Penguin UK. ISBN 978-1-846-14735-7.
- Brinkley, Joel (29 October 1989). "Inside the Intifada". The New York Times Magazine.
- Brown, John (24 April 2017). "Arrest of Palestinians for Potential Terror Attacks Brings New Meaning to 'Minority Report'". Haaretz.
- Byman, Daniel (March–April 2006). "Do Targeted Killings Work?". Foreign Affairs. Vol. 85, no. 2. pp. 95–111. JSTOR 20031914.
- Byman, Daniel (2011). A High Price: The Triumphs and Failures of Israeli Counterterrorism. Oxford University Press. p. 319. ISBN 978-0-199-83045-9 – via Internet Archive.
- Byman, Daniel; Sachs, Natan (September–October 2012). "The Rise of Settler Terrorism: The West Bank's Other Violent Extremists". Foreign Affairs. Vol. 91, no. 5. pp. 73–86. JSTOR 41720862.
- Careccia, Grazia; Reynolds, John J. (November 2006). al-Nu'man Village: a case study of indirect forcible transfer (PDF). Al-Haq. pp. 1–48. Archived from the original (PDF) on 19 April 2016.
- Chalom, Adam (2014). "Understanding a Religious Western Democracy: Israel and Its Complexities". In Pinn, A. (ed.). Theism and Public Policy: Humanist Perspectives and Responses. Springer. pp. 53–69. ISBN 978-1-137-46530-6.
- Chappell, Bill (1 February 2022). "Israel is an apartheid state, Amnesty International says". National Public Radio.
- de Chatel, Francesca (2011). Water Sheikhs and Dam Builders: Stories of People and Water in the Middle East. Transaction Publishers. ISBN 978-1-412-80988-7.
- Cheshin, Amir; Hutman, Bill; Melamed, Avi (2009). Separate and Unequal. Harvard University Press. ISBN 978-0-674-02952-1.
- Children in Israeli Military Detention: Observations and Recommendations (PDF). UNICEF. February 2013. Archived from the original (PDF) on 30 September 2020.
- Chomsky, Noam; Achcar, Gilbert; Shalom, Stephan R. (2015). Perilous Power: The Middle East and U.S. Foreign Policy Dialogues on Terror, Democracy, War, and Justice. Routledge. ISBN 978-1-317-25430-0.
- Cohen, Amnon (1984). Jewish life under Islam: Jerusalem in the sixteenth century. Harvard University Press. ISBN 978-0-674-47436-9.
- Cohen, Esther Rosalind (1985). Human Rights in the Israeli-occupied Territories, 1967-1982. Manchester University Press. ISBN 978-0-719-01726-1.
- Cohen, Hillel (2010a). "The Matrix of surveillance in times of national conflict: the Israeli-Palestinian case". In Zureik, Elia; Lyon, David; Abu-Laban, Yasmeen (eds.). Surveillance and Control in Israel/Palestine: Population, Territory and Power. Routledge. pp. 99–111. ISBN 978-1-136-93097-3.
- Cohen, Samy (2010b). Israel's Asymmetric Wars. Springer. ISBN 978-0-230-11297-1.
- Cohen, Stephen P. (2009). Beyond America's Grasp: A Century of Failed Diplomacy in the Middle East. Farrar, Straus and Giroux. ISBN 978-1-429-94237-9.
- "Commission of Inquiry finds that the Israeli occupation is unlawful under international law". OHCHR.
- Cook, Jonathan (2013a). Palestine: Israel's Experiments in Human Despair. Zed Books. ISBN 978-1-848-13649-6.
- Cook, Jonathan (September 2013b). ""The Lab": Israel Tests Weapons, Tactics On Captive Palestinian Population". WRMEA. pp. 16–17.
- Cooley, John K. (Spring 1984). "The War over Water". Foreign Policy. No. 54. pp. 3–26. JSTOR 1148352.
- Cordesman, Anthony H. (2006). Arab-Israeli Military Forces in an Era of Asymmetric Wars. Greenwood Publishing Group. ISBN 978-0-275-99186-9.
- Crowley, Michael; McLeish, Catriona; Revill, James (2018). "The Role of Civil Society in Combating the Development, Proliferation and Use of Chemical Weapons". In Shang, Lijun; Dando, Malcolm; Crowley, Michael (eds.). Preventing Chemical Weapons: Arms Control and Disarmament as the Sciences Converge. Royal Society of Chemistry. pp. 580–619. ISBN 978-1-782-62649-7.
- "The Dangerous Consequences of American Law Enforcement Trainings in Israel" (PDF). Deadly Exchange. RAIA/Jewish Voice for Peace. September 2018.
- Davies, Philip E. (Spring 1979). "The Educated West Bank Palestinians". Journal of Palestine Studies. 8 (3): 65–80. doi:10.2307/2536225. JSTOR 2536225.
- De Waart, P. J. I. M (1994). Dynamics of Self-determination in Palestine: Protection of Peoples as a Human Rights. Brill. ISBN 978-9-004-09825-1.
- Denes, Nick (2010). "From tanks to wheelchairs: unmanned aerial vehicles, Zionist battlefield experiments, and the transparence of the civilian". In Zureik, Elia; Lyon, David; Abu-Laban, Yasmeen (eds.). Surveillance and Control in Israel/Palestine: Population, Territory and Power. Routledge. pp. 171–195. ISBN 978-1-136-93097-3.
- Dinstein, Yoram (2009). The International Law of Belligerent Occupation. Cambridge University Press. ISBN 978-0-521-89637-5.
- Domb, Fania (2007). "The Separation Fence in the International Court of Justice and the High Court of Justice: Commonalities, Differences and Specifics". In Schmitt, Michael N.; Pejic, Jelena (eds.). International Law and Armed Conflict: Exploring the Faultlines: Essays in Honour of Yoram Dinstein. Martinus Nijhoff Publishers. pp. 509–542. ISBN 978-90-47-42125-2.
- Dumper, Michael (2010). "Constructive Ambiguities: Jerusalem, international law, and the peace process". In Akram, Susan; Dumper, Michael; Lynk, Michael; Scobbie, Iain (eds.). International Law and the Israeli-Palestinian Conflict: A Rights-Based Approach to Middle East Peace. Taylor & Francis. ISBN 978-1-136-85097-4.
- Dwoskin, Elizabeth (8 November 2021). "Israel escalates surveillance of Palestinians with facial recognition program in West Bank". The Washington Post.
- Dzikansky, Mordecai; Kleiman, Gil; Slater, Robert (2016). Terrorist Suicide Bombings: Attack Interdiction, Mitigation, and Response. CRC Press. ISBN 978-1-439-87132-4.
- The economic costs of the Israeli occupation for the occupied Palestinian territory (PDF). ARIJ and the Palestinian Ministry of National Economy (PMNE). September 2011. Archived from the original (PDF) on 29 January 2021.
- Economic Costs of the Israeli occupation for the Palestinian people (PDF). UNCTAD. 21 July 2016.
- Efrat, Elisha (2006). The West Bank and Gaza Strip: A Geography of Occupation and Disengagement. Routledge. ISBN 978-1-134-17217-7.
- Ehrenreich, Ben (2016). The Way to the Spring: Life and Death in Palestine. Granta Books. ISBN 978-1-783-78312-0.
- El-Ahmed, Nabila; Abu-Zahra, Nadia (Spring 2016). "Unfulfilled Promise: Palestinian Family Reunification and the Right of Return". Journal of Palestine Studies. 45 (3): 24–39. doi:10.1525/jps.2016.45.3.24. JSTOR 4284056.
- El-Farra, Majed; MacMillen, Malcolm (January 2000). "External Constraints on Manufacturing Development in Israeli-Occupied Gaza". Middle Eastern Studies. 36 (1): 153–170. doi:10.1080/00263200008701302. JSTOR 4284056. S2CID 144822037.
- Erakat, Noura (2019). Justice for Some: Law and the Question of Palestine. Stanford, CA: Stanford University Press. ISBN 978-0-8047-9825-9.
- Escribano, Marisa; El-Joubeh, Nazmi (Autumn 1981). "Migration and Change in a West Bank Village: The Case of Deir Dibwan". Journal of Palestine Studies. 11 (1): 150–160. doi:10.2307/2536052. JSTOR 2536052.
- Falah, Ghazi-Walid (2005). "The Geopolitics of 'Enclavisation' and the Demise of a Two-State Solution to the Israeli-Palestinian Conflict". Third World Quarterly. 26 (8): 1341–1372. doi:10.1080/01436590500255007. JSTOR 4017718. S2CID 154697979.
- Falk, Richard (Winter 2002). "Azmi Bishara, the Right of Resistance, and the Palestinian Ordeal". Journal of Palestine Studies. 31 (2): 19–33. doi:10.1525/jps.2002.31.2.19. JSTOR 10.1525/jps.2002.31.2.19.
- Farsakh, Leila (Spring 2005). "Independence, Cantons, or Bantustans: Whither the Palestinian State?". Middle East Journal. 59 (2): 230–245. doi:10.3751/59.2.13. JSTOR 4330126.
- Feldinger, Lauren Gelfond (13 April 2013). "The politics of water: Palestinians bracing for another dry summer". Haaretz.
- Fields, Gary (2017). Enclosure: Palestinian Landscapes in a Historical Mirror. University of California Press. ISBN 978-0-520-29104-1.
- Findlay, Len (2010). "Academic and Artistic Freedom and the Israel-Palestine Conflict: Towards a Canadian Pedagogy of the Suppressed". Cultural and Pedagogical Inquiry. 2 (2): 5–18. ISSN 1916-3460.
- Finkelstein, Norman (Winter 1991). "Israel and Iraq: A Double Standard". Journal of Palestine Studies. 20 (2): 43–56. doi:10.2307/2537197. JSTOR 2537197.
- Finkelstein, Norman (2018). Gaza: An Inquest into Its Martyrdom. Berkeley, CA: University of California Press. ISBN 978-0-520-29571-1.
- Fisk, Robert (23 August 2018). "Israel is building another 1,000 homes on Palestinian land. Where's the outrage?". The Independent.
- Francis, Sahar (Summer 2014). "Status of Palestinian Prisoners in International Humanitarian Law". Journal of Palestine Studies. 43 (4): 39–48. doi:10.1525/jps.2014.43.4.39. ISBN 978-1-466-80054-0. JSTOR 10.1525/jps.2014.43.4.39.
- Freilich, Charles D. (2018). Israeli National Security: A New Strategy for an Era of Change. Oxford University Press. ISBN 978-0-190-60293-2.
- Friedman, Robert (Autumn 1983). "Israeli Censorship of the Palestinian Press". Journal of Palestine Studies. 13 (1): 93–101. doi:10.2307/2536927. JSTOR 2536927.
- Galchinsky, Michael (Fall 2004). "The Jewish Settlements in the West Bank: International Law and Israeli Jurisprudence". Israel Studies. 9 (3): 115–136. doi:10.2979/ISR.2004.9.3.115. JSTOR 30245641. S2CID 144282494.
- Gallo, Giorgio; Marzano, Arturo (2009). "The Dynamics of Asymmetric Conflicts: The Israeli-Palestinian Case". The Journal of Conflict Studies. 29: 1–18.
- Galnoor, Itzhak (2010). Public Management in Israel: Development, Structure, Functions and Reforms. Routledge. ISBN 978-1-136-92386-9.
- Galtung, Johan (1971). "The Middle East and the Theory of Conflict". Journal of Peace Research. 8 (3–4): 173–206. doi:10.1177/002234337100800301. JSTOR 423072. S2CID 110763655.
- Gautney, Heather (2009). "The Globalization of Violence in the 21st Century: Israel, Palestine, and the War on Terror". In Aronowitz, Stanley; Gautney, Heather (eds.). Implicating Empire. Hachette UK. pp. 65–82. ISBN 978-0-786-74992-8.
- Gazit, Shlomo (2003). Trapped Fools: Thirty Years of Israeli Policy in the Territories. Frank Cass Publisher. ISBN 978-0-714-65489-8.
- Ghanim, Honaida (2017). "From Kubaniya to Outpost: A Genealogy of the Palestinian conceptualization of Jewish Settlement in a Shifting National Context". In Handel, Ariel; Allegra, Marco; Maggor, Erez (eds.). Normalizing Occupation: The Politics of Everyday Life in the West Bank Settlements. Indiana University Press. pp. 151–170. ISBN 978-0-253-02505-0.
- Gleim, Sarah (12 November 2015). "Skunk Water: A Weapon That Uses Stench to Control Crowds". HowStuffWorks.
- Glock, Albert (Spring 1994). "Archaeology as Cultural Survival: The Future of the Palestinian Past". Journal of Palestine Studies. 23 (3): 70–84. doi:10.2307/2537961. JSTOR 2537961.
- Goldberg, J.J. (3 November 2014). "106 Retired Israeli Generals, Spy Chiefs Urge Netanyahu to Push for Peace". Haaretz. Archived from the original on 5 September 2018.
- Goldstein, Michael (Winter 1978). "Israeli Security Measures in the Occupied Territories: Administrative Detention". Middle East Journal. 32 (1): 35–44. JSTOR 4325711.
- Gordis, Avishay Ben-Sasson; Levi, Yonatan (12 December 2017). Israel's National Security and West Bank Settlements (PDF). Molad.
- Gordon, Neve (2008). Israel's Occupation. University of California Press. ISBN 978-0-520-94236-3.
- Gordon, Neve (2010). "Israel's emergence as a homeland security capital". In Zureik, Elia; Lyon, David; Abu-Laban, Yasmeen (eds.). Surveillance and Control in Israel/Palestine: Population, Territory and Power. Routledge. pp. 153–169. ISBN 978-1-136-93097-3.
- Gordon, Neve (June 2014). "Human Rights as a Security Threat: Lawfare and the Campaign against Human RightsNGOs". Law & Society Review. 48 (2): 311–344. doi:10.1111/lasr.12074. JSTOR 43670395.
- Gorenberg, Gershom (2007). The Accidental Empire: Israel and the Birth of the Settlements, 1967-1977. Macmillan Publishers. ISBN 978-1-466-80054-0.
- Grace, Anne (Winter 1990). "The Tax Resistance at Bayt Sahur". Journal of Palestine Studies. 19 (2): 99–107. doi:10.2307/2537416. JSTOR 2537416.
- Graff, James A. (2015). "Targeting Children: Rights versus Realpolitik". In Kapitan, Tomis (ed.). Philosophical Perspectives on the Israeli-Palestinian Conflict (2nd ed.). Routledge. pp. 157–184. ISBN 978-1-317-46285-9.
- Graham, Stephen (2010). "Laboratories of War: surveillance and US-Israeli collaboration in war and security". In Zureik, Elia; Lyon, David; Abu-Laban, Yasmeen (eds.). Surveillance and Control in Israel/Palestine: Population, Territory and Power. Routledge. pp. 133–152. ISBN 978-1-136-93097-3.
- Grinberg, Lev Luis (2009). Politics and Violence in Israel/Palestine: Democracy Versus Military Rule. Routledge. ISBN 978-1-135-27589-1.
- Gross, Judah Ari (6 September 2018). "Israel to close West Bank, Gaza during upcoming holidays". The Times of Israel.
- Hajjar, Lisa (2005). Courting Conflict: The Israeli Military Court System in the West Bank and Gaza. University of California Press. ISBN 978-0-520-24194-7.
- Hajjar, Lisas (Autumn 2006). "International Humanitarian Law and "Wars on Terror": A Comparative Analysis of Israeli and American Doctrines and Policies". Journal of Palestine Studies. 36 (1): 21–42. doi:10.1525/jps.2006.36.1.21. JSTOR 10.1525/jps.2006.36.1.21. S2CID 155193067.
- Halper, Jeff (19 June 2020). "Israelizing the American police, Palestinianizing the American people". Mondoweiss.
- Handel, Ariel (2008). "Where to, and When in the Occupied Territories: An Introduction to the Geography of Disaster" (PDF). In Ophir, Adi; Givoni, Michal; Hanafi, Sari (eds.). The Power of Inclusive Exclusion: Anatomy of the Israeli Rule in the Occupied Territories. Zone Books. pp. 179–222. ISBN 978-1-890951-92-4. Archived from the original (PDF) on 3 February 2019.
- Handel, Ariel (2010). "Exclusionary surveillance and spatial uncertainty in the occupied Palestinian territories". In Zureik, Elia; Lyon, David; Abu-Laban, Yasmeen (eds.). Surveillance and Control in Israel/Palestine: Population, Territory and Power. Routledge. pp. 259–274. ISBN 978-1-136-93097-3.
- Handel, Ariel (2014). "Gated/gating community: the settlement complex in the West Bank" (PDF). Transactions of the Institute of British Geographers. 39 (4): 504–517. Bibcode:2014TrIBG..39..504H. doi:10.1111/tran.12045. Archived from the original (PDF) on 30 September 2020.
- Harel, Amos (3 September 2003). "IDF's Guidelines for Field Officers in the Territories: Respect Palestinian Civilians and Use Common Sense". Haaretz. Archived from the original on 12 March 2020.
- Harel, Amos (5 June 2017). "Settlements Do Not Serve Israel's Security Needs, Say Former Generals". Haaretz.
- Hareuveni, Eyal (June 2009). Foul Play Neglect of Wastewater Treatment in the West Bank (PDF) (Report). Translated by Zvi Shulman. B'Tselem.
- Hareuveni, Eyal (May 2011). Dispossession and Exploitation: Israel's Policy in the Jordan Valley and Northern Dead Sea (PDF). B'Tselem.
- Hass, Amira (2000). Drinking the Sea at Gaza: Days and Nights in a Land under Siege. Owl Books. ISBN 978-0-8050-5740-9.
- Hass, Amira (Spring 2002). "Israel's Closure Policy: an Ineffective Strategy of Containment and Repression". Journal of Palestine Studies. 31 (3): 5–20. doi:10.1525/jps.2002.31.3.5. JSTOR 10.1525/jps.2002.31.3.5.
- Hass, Amira (29 January 2018a). "Israeli Soldiers in West Bank: Raiding, Arresting, Mapping and Getting Home for Shabbat". Haaretz. Archived from the original on 29 January 2018.
- Hass, Amira (13 October 2018b). "Israel Seeks to Deport to Brazil Man Who Has Lived Almost Entire Life in West Bank". Haaretz.
- Hasson, Nir (19 May 2019). "Israeli West Bank Archaeological Digs Must Not Be Made Public, Top Court Rules". Haaretz.
- Hasson, Nir (9 September 2021). "The Unexpected Reason Israel Is Improving Conditions for Jerusalem Palestinians". Haaretz.
- Henriksen, Thomas H. (February 2007). The Israeli Approach to Irregular Warfare and its Implications for the United (PDF). ISOU. ISBN 978-1-933749-06-8. Archived (PDF) from the original on 23 February 2017.
- Hirschhorn, Sara Yael (2017). City on a Hilltop: American Jews and the Israeli Settler Movement. Harvard University Press. ISBN 978-0-674-97505-7.
- Holmes, Oliver (27 April 2021). "Israel is committing the crime of apartheid, rights group says". The Guardian.
- "How Dispossession Happens: The Humanitarian Impact of the Takeover of Palestinian Water Springs by Israeli Settlers" (PDF). Office for the Coordination of Humanitarian Affairs occupied Palestinian territory. March 2012.
- Hunt, Naomi, ed. (2013). Use With Care: A Reporter's Glossary of Loaded Language in the Israeli-Palestinian Conflict (PDF). International Press Institute. ISBN 978-3-9503007-9-6.
- Hutchison, E. H. (1956). Violent Truce – A Military Observer Looks at the Arab-Israeli Conflict 1951–1955. The Devin – Adair Company. pp. 12–16 – via Internet Archive.
- ICG (20 December 2012). Extreme Makeover? (II): The Withering of Arab Jerusalem (PDF). International Crisis Group. Archived from the original (PDF) on 12 May 2019.
- "ICJ sets dates for submission of statements on Israel's practices in the occupied Palestinian territories". WAFA. Wafa. 9 February 2023.
- Imseis, Ardi (Autumn 2000). "Review: Law, Reality, and the Oslo 'Peace' Process". Oxford Journal of Legal Studies. 20 (3): 469–476. doi:10.1093/ojls/20.3.469. JSTOR 20468333.
- Imseis, Ardi (2020). "Negotiating the Illegal: On the United Nations and the Illegal Occupation of Palestine, 1967–2020". European Journal of International Law. 31 (3): 1055–1085. doi:10.1093/ejil/chaa055. ISSN 0938-5428.
- Imseis, Ardi (2023). The United Nations and the Question of Palestine: Rule by Law and the Structure of International Legal Subalternity. Cambridge University Press. ISBN 978-1-316-51389-7.
- Inbar, Efraim (2007). Israel's National Security: Issues and Challenges Since the Yom Kippur War. Routledge. ISBN 978-1-134-05939-3.
- International Court of Justice (19 July 2024). Legal Consequences arising from the Policies and Practices of Israel in the Occupied Palestinian Territory, including East Jerusalem (PDF) (Report). International Court of Justice.
- Irish Centre for Human Rights at the University of Galway, commissioned by the United Nations Committee on the Exercise of the Inalienable Rights of the Palestinian People (2023). The Legality of the Israeli Occupation of the Occupied Palestinian Territory, Including East Jerusalem (PDF) (Report). United Nations. pp. 31–36 – via ReliefWeb.
- Isaac, Jad; Khalil, Manal; Rishmawi, Khaldoun; Dabouqi, Ahmad; Marinelli, Ludovico (2015). The Economic Cost of the Israeli Occupation of the occupied Palestinian Territories (PDF). ARIJ. Archived from the original (PDF) on 10 August 2020.
- Isaac, Rami (2013). "Palestine: Tourism Under Occupation". In Butler, Richard; Suntikul, Wantanee (eds.). Tourism and War. Routledge. pp. 143–158. ISBN 978-1-136-26309-5.
- "Israel and Occupied Palestinian Territories" (PDF). Amnesty International Report 2017/18: The State of the World's Human Rights. Amnesty International. 2018b. pp. 207–211. ISBN 978-0-86210-499-3.
- "Israel: 50 Years of Occupation Abuses". Human Rights Watch. 4 June 2017a.
- "Israel: Jerusalem Palestinians Stripped of Status". Human Rights Watch. 8 August 2017b.
- "Israeli authorities must end collective punishment of Palestinians in Hebronm protect human rights defenders in the city" (PDF). Amnesty International. 25 February 2016. pp. 1–6.
- "Israeli forces suppress Friday protests in Kafr Qaddum". Ma'an News Agency. 17 November 2017.
- "Israeli jailed over baby tragedy". BBC News. 12 September 2008.
- "Israeli military night-raids on Palestinian residences in the West Bank and East Jerusalem" (PDF). Women's Centre for Legal Aid and Counselling. 26 June 2015.
- "The Israeli Permit Regime: Realities and Challenges" (PDF). ARIJ. 2018. pp. 1–31. Archived from the original (PDF) on 25 June 2021.
- "Israel's Settlements Have No Legal Validity, Constitute Flagrant Violation of International Law, Security Council Reaffirms". United Nations Security Council. 23 December 2016.
- Jamjoum, Lama (2002). "The Effects of Israeli Violations During the Second Uprising "Intifada" on Palestinian Health Conditions". Social Justice. 29 (3): 53–72. JSTOR 29768136.
- "The Jordan Valley". B'Tselem. 11 November 2017c.
- Joyce, Tom (12 April 2016). "The Palestinian farmers battling border restrictions and lack of water". The Guardian.
- Kadmon, Sima (5 December 2016). "Hebron shooting: A micromodel of Israel's maladies". Ynetnews.
- Kadri, Ali (Autumn 1998). "A Survey of Commuting Labor from the West Bank to Israel". Middle East Journal. 52 (4): 517–530. JSTOR 4329251.
- Kamrava, Mehran (2016). The Impossibility of Palestine: History, Geography, and the Road Ahead. Yale University Press. ISBN 978-0-300-22085-8.
- Kane, Alex (7 July 2016). "Post Share Arrest: Israel targeting Palestinian Protestors on Facebook". The Intercept.
- Kanonich, Yonatan (December 2017). Stahl, Ziv; Amihai, Lior; Wijler, Miryam (eds.). "Through the Lens of Israel's Interests: The Civil Administration in the West Bank" (PDF). Position paper. Yesh Din.
- Kaplan, Amy (2018). Our American Israel: The Story of an Entangled Alliance. Harvard University Press. ISBN 978-0-674-98992-4.
- Karayanni, Michael (2014). Conflicts in a Conflict: A Conflict of Laws Case Study on Israel and the Palestinian Territories. Oxford University Press. ISBN 978-0-199-87371-5.
- Kårtveit, Bård (2014). Dilemmas of Attachment: Identity and Belonging among Palestinian Christians. Brill. ISBN 978-9-004-27639-0.
- Kattenburg, David (8 October 2021). "How Apartheid Israel stifles Palestinian education and scientific research Mondoweiss". Mondoweiss.
- Kelly, Tobias (November 2004). "Returning Home? Law, Violence, and Displacement among West Bank Palestinians". Political and Legal Anthropology Review. 27 (2): 95–112. doi:10.1525/pol.2004.27.2.95. JSTOR 24497425.
- Kelly, Tobias (2006). Law, Violence and Sovereignty Among West Bank Palestinians. Cambridge University Press. ISBN 978-1-139-46099-6.
- Khalil, Asem; Del Sarto, Raffaella A. (2015). "The Legal Fragmentation of Palestine-Israel and European Union Policies Promoting the Rule of Law". In Del Sarto, Raffaella A. (ed.). Fragmented Borders, Interdependence and External Relations: The Israel-Palestine-European Union Triangle. Palgrave. pp. 129–154. ISBN 978-1-137-50413-5.
- Kidron, Peretz (2013). Refusenik!: Israel's Soldiers of Conscience. Zed Books. ISBN 978-1-84813-766-0.
- Kimmerling, Baruch (2003). Politicide: Ariel Sharon's War Against the Palestinians. Verso Books. p. 16. ISBN 978-1-859-84517-2 – via Internet Archive.
- King, Mary Elizabeth (2009). "Palestinian Civil Resistance Against Israeli Military Occupation". In Stephan, Maria J. (ed.). Civilian Jihad: Nonviolent Struggle, Democratization, and Governance in the Middle East. PalgraveMacmillan. pp. 131–156. ISBN 978-0-230-10175-3.
- Kohavi, Itai; Nowiak, Wojciech (15 December 2017). "The Impact of West Bank Settlements on Israeli National Security". Przegląd Strategiczny (10): 157–172. doi:10.14746/ps.2017.1.8. hdl:10593/22378. ISSN 2084-6991.
- Koren, David (13 September 2018). "The desire of eastern Jerusalem Arabs to integrate in Israeli society outweighs the threats of the Palestinian Authority". JISS.
- Krämer, Gudrun (2011). A History of Palestine: From the Ottoman Conquest to the Founding of the State of Israel. Princeton University Press. ISBN 978-0-691-15007-9.
- Kubovich, Yaniv (24 March 2022). "Israeli Troops' New Quota: Add 50 Palestinians to Tracking Database Every Shift". Haaretz.
- Kumaraswamy, P.R. (2015). Historical Dictionary of the Arab-Israeli Conflict. Historical Dictionaries of War, Revolution, and Civil Unrest. Rowman & Littlefield. ISBN 978-1-4422-5170-0.
- Kuntsman, Adi; Stein, Rebecca (2015). Digital militarism: Israel's occupation in the social media age. Stanford University Press. ISBN 978-0-804-79497-8.
- Lazar, Hadara (February 1990). The system of taxation in the West Bank and Gaza Strip as an instrument for the enforcement of Authority during the Uprising (DOC) (Report). B'Tselem. ISSN 0792-4003.
- Lazaroff, Tovah (2 July 2018). "U.N. expert: Israel moving closer to formal West Bank annexation". The Jerusalem Post.
- Lazaroff, Tovah (21 October 2022). "Lapid: UN's CIO report is antisemitic and written by antisemites". The Jerusalem Post.
- Legal Consequences of the Construction of a Wall in the Occupied Palestinian Territory (PDF). International Court of Justice. 9 July 2004. Archived from the original (PDF) on 13 September 2020.
- Lein, Yehezkel; Weizman, Eyal (May 2002). Land Grab: Israel's Settlement Policy in the West Bank (PDF) (Report). B'Tselem.
- Lentin, Ronit (2018). Traces of Racial Exception: Racializing Israeli Settler Colonialism. Bloomsbury Publishing. ISBN 978-1-350-03205-7.
- Lesch, Ann M. (Winter 1979). "Israeli Deportation of Palestinians from the West Bank and the Gaza Strip, 1967-1978". Journal of Palestine Studies. 8 (2): 101–131. doi:10.2307/2536512. JSTOR 2536512.
- Levanon, Ofer Shinar (September 2015). Ethos of the Israeli-Palestinian Conflict as Reflected by the Judgments of the Israeli Supreme Court 1948 – 2006 (PDF) (PhD thesis). Hebrew University of Jerusalem.
- Levinson, Chaim (24 January 2017). "Torture, Israeli-style - as Described by the Interrogators Themselves". Haaretz.
- Levy, Gideon; Levac, Alex (30 August 2019). "'This Place Is Only for Jews': The West Bank's Apartheid Springs". Haaretz.
- Likhovski, Assaf (2017). Tax Law and Social Norms in Mandatory Palestine and Israel. Cambridge University Press. ISBN 978-1-316-82019-3.
- Lonergan, Stephen C. (1996). "Water Resources and Conflict: Examples from the Middle East". In Gleditsch, Nils Petter (ed.). Conflict and the Environment. International Development Research Centre/ North Atlantic Treaty Organization. Scientific Affairs Division. pp. 375–384. ISBN 978-0-792-34768-2.
- Lukacs, Yehuda (1999). Israel, Jordan, and the Peace Process. Syracuse University Press. ISBN 978-0-815-62855-2.
- Lustick, Ian (2018). Unsettled States, Disputed Lands: Britain and Ireland, France and Algeria, Israel and the West Bank-Gaza. Cornell University Press. ISBN 978-1-501-73194-5.
- Macintyre, Donald (14 June 2008). "Palestinians barred from Dead Sea beaches to 'appease Israeli settlers'". The Independent.
- Makdisi, Saree (2010). Palestine Inside Out: An Everyday Occupation. W. W. Norton & Company. ISBN 978-0-393-06996-9.
- Malki, Riad (2000). "The Physical Planning of Jerusalem". In Maʻoz, Moshe; Nusseibeh, Sari (eds.). Jerusalem: Points Beyond Friction, and Beyond. Kluwer Law International. pp. 25–63. ISBN 978-90-411-8843-4. OCLC 43481699.
- Maltz, Judy (23 June 2017). "Americans Disproportionately Leading the Charge in Settling the West Bank". Haaretz.
- Mansour, Antoine (2015). "The West Bank Economy: 1948–1984". In Abed, George T. (ed.). The Palestinian Economy: Studies in Development under Prolonged Occupation. Routledge. pp. 71–. ISBN 978-1-317-59291-4.
- Maoz, Moshe (2015). Palestinian Leadership on the West Bank. Routledge. ISBN 978-1-317-45031-3.
- Matar, Ibrahim (Autumn 1981). "Israeli Settlements in the West Bank and Gaza Strip". Journal of Palestine Studies. 11 (1): 93–110. doi:10.2307/2536048. JSTOR 2536048.
- McKernan, Bethan (29 June 2022). "Israel delays travel restrictions on West Bank in apparent gesture to Joe Biden". The Guardian.
- Mearsheimer, John; Walt, Stephen (March 2006). "The Israel Lobby". London Review of Books. Vol. 28, no. 6. pp. 3–12.
- Melzer, Nils (2008). Targeted Killing in International Law. Oxford University Press. ISBN 978-0-199-53316-9.
- Mendel, Yonatan (6 March 2008). "Diary". London Review of Books. Vol. 30, no. 5. pp. 30–31.
- Meneley, Anne (June 2011). "Blood, Sweat and Tears in a Bottle of Palestinian Extra-Virgin Olive Oil". Food, Culture & Society. 14 (2): 275–292. doi:10.2752/175174411X12893984828872. S2CID 155491784 – via ResearchGate.
- Michaeli, Sarit (January 2013). Crowd Control: Israel's Use of Crowd Control Weapons in the West Bank (PDF). B'Tselem.
- Mintz, Alex (1983). "The military-industrial complex: The Israeli case". Journal of Strategic Studies. 6 (3): 623–639. doi:10.1080/01402398308437160. JSTOR 174246.
- Morris, Benny (1993). Israel's Border Wars, 1949–1956. Oxford University Press. ISBN 978-0-19-829262-3.
- Musaee, Anwar H. M; Abbas, Eeman Muhammad; Mujan, Wan Kamal; Sidik, Roziah (2014). "Waqf Land in the West Bank and Investment Current State of Affairs". Asian Social Science. 10 (14): 23–39. doi:10.5539/ass.v10n14p23 – via ResearchGate.
- Niksic, Orhan; Eddin, Nur Nasser; Cali, Massimiliano (2014). Area C and the Future of the Palestinian Economy. World Bank Publications. ISBN 978-1-464-80196-9.
- "No shelter for the 25 residents, including 15 children, of Khirbet 'Ein Karzaliyah". B'Tselem. 12 February 2014.
- Nusseibeh, Sari (2015). Once Upon a Country: A Palestinian Life. Farrar, Straus and Giroux. ISBN 978-1-250-09875-7.
- "The Occupation of Water". Amnesty International. November 2017.
- "Occupation, Inc. How Settlement Businesses Contribute to Israel's Violations of Palestinian Rights". Human Rights Watch. 19 January 2016.
- O'Malley, Padraig (2015). The Two-State Delusion: Israel and Palestine—A Tale of Two Narratives. Penguin Books. ISBN 978-0-698-19218-8.
- "Operation Patient: The Hidden Story of the Initiative to Deport Palestinian Prisoners to Jordan". Akevot Institute for Israeli-Palestinian Conflict Research. 27 July 2021.
- Opportunities and Challenges of Palestinian Development actions in Area C (PDF) (Report). ARIJ. 2016. Archived from the original (PDF) on 1 September 2020.
- Overview of Israel's Demolition Policy (PDF). Israeli Committee Against House Demolitions. December 2017. Archived from the original (PDF) on 22 August 2020.
- "Palestinian minors killed by Israeli security forces in the West Bank, since Operation Cast Lead". B'Tselem. 2018b.
- Parker, Richard B. (Spring 1992). "The June 1967 War: Some Mysteries Explored". Middle East Journal. 46 (2): 177–197. JSTOR 4328429.
- Pedahzur, Ami; Perliger, Arie (2009). Jewish Terrorism in Israel. Columbia University Press. p. 73. ISBN 978-0-231-15446-8 – via Internet Archive.
- Peled, Yoav (2006). "From Zionism to Capitalism: The Political Economy of the Neoliberal Warfare State". In Beinin, Joel; Stein, Rebecca L. (eds.). The Struggle for Sovereignty: Palestine and Israel, 1993-2005. Stanford University Press. pp. 38–53. ISBN 978-0-8047-5365-4.
- Peleg, Ilan (1995). Human Rights in the West Bank and Gaza: Legacy and Politics. Syracuse University Press. p. 162. ISBN 978-0-815-62682-4 – via Internet Archive.
- Pelleg-Sryck, Tamar (2011). "The Mysteries of Administrative Detention". In Baker, Abeer; Matar, Anat (eds.). Threat: Palestinian Political Prisoners in Israel. Pluto Press. pp. 123–135. ISBN 978-0-745-33021-1.
- Penslar, Derek (2007). Israel in History: The Jewish State in Comparative Perspective. Routledge. ISBN 978-1-134-14669-7.
- Peri, Yoram (2006). Generals in the Cabinet Room: How the Military Shapes Israeli Policy. United States Institute of Peace Press. ISBN 978-1-929-22381-7.
- Peteet, Julie (February 1994). "Male Gender and Rituals of Resistance in the Palestinian "Intifada": A Cultural Politics of Violence". American Ethnologist. 21 (1): 31–49. doi:10.1525/ae.1994.21.1.02a00020. JSTOR 646520.
- Peteet, Julie (May 1996). "The Writing on the Walls: The Graffiti of the Intifada". Cultural Anthropology. 11 (2): 139–159. doi:10.1525/can.1996.11.2.02a00010. JSTOR 656446. S2CID 143605458.
- Peteet, Julie (Winter 2016). "The Work of Comparison: Israel/Palestine and Apartheid". Anthropological Quarterly. 89 (1): 247–281. doi:10.1353/anq.2016.0015. JSTOR 43955521. S2CID 147128703.
- Peters, Joel (2012). "Israel". In Peters, Joel (ed.). The European Union and the Arab Spring: Promoting Democracy and Human Rights in the Middle East. Lexington Books. pp. 77–92. ISBN 978-0-739-17444-9.
- Pieterse, Jan (1984). "State Terrorism on a Global Scale: The Role of Israel". Crime and Social Justice. 21–22 (4): 58–80. JSTOR 297662307.
- Plaw, Avery (2016). Targeting Terrorists: A License to Kill?. Routledge. ISBN 978-1-317-04671-4.
- Playfair, Emma (Fall 1988). "Israel's Security Needs in the West Bank, Real and Contrived". Arab Studies Quarterly. 10 (4): 406–423. JSTOR 41857980.
- "PM: IDF to keep operating in West Bank areas under full PA control". The Times of Israel. 21 April 2016.
- Poissonnier, Ghislain; David, Eric (2020). "Israeli Settlements in the West Bank, a War Crime?". Revue des droits de l'homme. 17 (17). doi:10.4000/revdh.7613.
- Pollock, David (8 July 2022). "New Poll Reveals Moderate Trend Among East Jerusalem Palestinians". The Washington Institute for Nar East Policy. WINEP.
- Poole, Steven (2007). Unspeak: How Words Become Weapons, How Weapons Become a Message, and How That Message Becomes Reality. Grove Atlantic. ISBN 978-1-555-84872-9.
- Popp, Roland (Spring 2006). "Stumbling Decidedly into the Six-Day War". Middle East Journal. 60 (2): 281–309. doi:10.3751/194034606783996500. JSTOR 4330250.
- Punamäki, Raija-Leena (Summer 1988). "Experiences of Torture, Means of Coping, and Level of Symptoms among PalestinianPolitical Prisoners". Journal of Palestine Studies. 17 (4): 81–96. doi:10.2307/2537292. JSTOR 2537292.
- Quigley, John B. (2005). The Case for Palestine: An International Law Perspective. Duke University Press. ISBN 978-0-822-33539-9.
- Quigley, John B. (2009). "Palestine: The Issue of Statehood". In Silverburg, Sanford R. (ed.). Palestine and International Law: Essays on Politics and Economics. Jefferson, NC and London: McFarland & Company. pp. 37–43. ISBN 978-0-786-44248-5.
- Quigley, John B. (2018). The Economic Costs of the Israeli Occupation for the Palestinian People and Their Human Right to Development (PDF). UNCTAD.
- Rahmeh, Abdullah Abu (26 February 2015). "A Decade of Civil Disobedience in My West Bank Village". Haaretz.
- "Ralph Wilde". UCL Faculty of Laws. University College London. 11 September 2017. Archived from the original on 16 March 2022.
- Rapoport, Meron (23 August 2024). "Israeli society's dehumanization of Palestinians is now absolute". +972 Magazine.
- Rathbun, Brian C. (2014). Diplomacy's Value: Creating Security in 1920s Europe and the Contemporary Middle East. Cornell University Press. p. 205. ISBN 978-0-801-45505-6 – via Internet Archive.
- Raz, Adam (3 June 2021a). "Israel Claimed Its 1967 Land Conquests Weren't Planned. Declassified Documents Reveal Otherwise". Haaretz.
- Raz, Adam (16 September 2021b). "When the Shin Bet Chief Warned That Educated Arabs Are a 'Problem' for Israel". Haaretz.
- Reinhart, Tanya (2011). Israel/Palestine: How to End the War of 1948 (2nd ed.). Seven Stories Press. ISBN 978-1-609-80122-9.
- Report of the Independent International Commission of Inquiry on the Occupied Palestinian Territory, including East Jerusalem, and Israel (PDF) (Report). OHCHR. 14 September 2022.
- "Restrictions on Movement". B'Tselem. 11 November 2017b.
- Reuveny, Rafael (Winter 2008). "The Last Colonialist: Israel in the Occupied Territories since 1967" (PDF). The Independent Review. 12 (3): 325–374.
- Rivlin, Paul (2010). The Israeli Economy from the Foundation of the State through the 21st Century. Cambridge University Press. ISBN 978-1-139-49396-3.
- Roberts, Adam (January 1990). "Prolonged Military Occupation: The Israeli-Occupied Territories Since 1967". The American Journal of International Law. 84 (1): 44–103. doi:10.2307/2203016. JSTOR 2203016. S2CID 145514740.
- Ron, James (1994). Torture and Ill-treatment: Israel's Interrogation of Palestinians from the Occupied Territories. Human Rights Watch. ISBN 978-1-564-32136-7.
- "A Routine Founded on Violence". B'Tselem. 11 November 2017a.
- Roy, Sara (Winter 2010). "Reflections on the Israeli-Palestinian Conflict in U.S. Public Discourse: Legitimizing Dissent". Journal of Palestine Studies. 39 (2): 23–38. doi:10.1525/jps.2010.xxxix.2.23. JSTOR 10.1525/jps.2010.xxxix.2.23.
- Rubenberg, Cheryl (2003). The Palestinians: In Search of a Just Peace. Lynne Rienner Publishers. p. 124. ISBN 978-1-588-26225-7 – via Internet Archive.
- Said, Edward W. (Summer 1991). "Reflections on Twenty Years of Palestinian History". Journal of Palestine Studies. 20 (4): 5–22. doi:10.2307/2537432. JSTOR 2537432.
- Sait, M. Siraj (Spring 2004). "Have Palestinian Children Forfeited Their Rights?". Journal of Comparative Family Studies. 35 (2): 211–228. doi:10.3138/jcfs.35.2.211. JSTOR 41603933.
- Sayed, Hani (2014). "The Fictions of the Illegal Occupation in the West Bank and Gaza". Oregon Review of International Law. 16: 79.
- Schnell, Izhak; Mishal, Shaul (April 2008). "Place as a Source of Identity in Colonizing Societies: Israeli Settlements in Gaza". Geographical Review. 98 (2): 242–259. Bibcode:2008GeoRv..98..242S. doi:10.1111/j.1931-0846.2008.tb00298.x. JSTOR 30034230. S2CID 154996074.
- Selby, Jan (2003b). Water, Power and Politics in the Middle East: The Other Israel-Palestine Conflict. I.B.Tauris. ISBN 978-1-860-64934-9.
- Shafir, Gershon (November 1984). "Changing Nationalism and Israel's "Open Frontier" on the West Bank". Theory & Society. 13 (6): 803–827. doi:10.1007/BF00209214. JSTOR 657140. S2CID 144216444.
- Shafir, Gershon (2017). A Half Century of Occupation: Israel, Palestine, and the World's Most Intractable Conflict. University of California Press. ISBN 978-0-520-29350-2.
- Shahak, Israel (Autumn 1974). "Ethos of Conflict of the Palestinian Society". Journal of Palestine Studies. 4 (1): 181–186. doi:10.2307/2535945. JSTOR 2535945.
- Shaked, Ronni (2016). "Ethos of Conflict of the Palestinian Society". In Sharvit, Keren; Halperin, Eran (eds.). A Social Psychology Perspective on The Israeli-Palestinian Conflict: Celebrating the Legacy of Daniel Bar-Tal. Vol. 2. Springer Publishing. pp. 133–149. ISBN 978-3-319-24841-7.
- Shalhoub-kevorkian, Nadera (January 2012). "E-Resistance and Technological In/Security in Everyday Life: The Palestinian Case". The British Journal of Criminology. 52 (1): 55–72. doi:10.1093/bjc/azr059. JSTOR 44173471.
- Sharkey, Heather J. (2003). Living with Colonialism: Nationalism and Culture in the Anglo-Egyptian Sudan. University of California Press. ISBN 978-0-520-23559-5.
- Shauli, Avi (9 June 2007). "Cost of occupation – over $50 billion". Ynetnews.
- Shehadeh, Raja (1985a). Occupier's law: Israel and the West Bank. Institute for Palestine Studies. ISBN 978-0-887-28149-5.
- Shehadeh, Raja (Spring–Summer 1985b). "Some Legal Aspects of Israeli Land Policy in the Occupied Territories". Arab Studies Quarterly. 7 (2–3): 42–61. JSTOR 41857768.
- Shehadeh, Raja (17 September 2020). "Occupying Palestine is rotting Israel from inside. No Gulf peace deal can hide that". The Guardian.
- Sher, Gilead (2006). The Israeli–Palestinian Peace Negotiations, 1999–2001: Within Reach. Routledge. ISBN 978-0-714-68542-7.
- Sherwood, Harriet (5 December 2013). "Israeli former security chief: failure to end conflict is bigger threat than Iran". The Guardian.
- Shezaf, Hagar (23 June 2020). "When an Archaeological 'Find' Can Evict Palestinians From Their Home". Haaretz.
- Shezaf, Hagar (8 July 2021). "Palestinians Claiming Land at Illegal Outpost Take Israel's Deal With Settlers to Court". Haaretz.
- Shezaf, Hagar; Kubovich, Yaniv (26 August 2020). "Israeli Soldiers Placed Explosives in West Bank Village for 'Deterrence'". Haaretz.
- Shinn, Chris (November 2012). "Teacher Education Reform in Palestine: Policy Challenges amid Donor Expectations". Comparative Education Review. 56 (4): 608–633. doi:10.1086/667434. JSTOR 10.1086/667434. S2CID 144932152.
- Shlaim, Avi (2012). "Poor Little Samson". In Shlaim, Avi; Louis, Wm Roger (eds.). The 1967 Arab-Israeli War: Origins and Consequences. Cambridge University Press. pp. 22–54. ISBN 978-1-107-00236-4.
- Shlaim, Avi (2015). "Israeli Interference in Internal Arab Politics: The Case of Lebanon". In Luciani, Giacomo; Salamé, Ghassan (eds.). The Politics of Arab Integration. Routledge. pp. 232–254. ISBN 978-1-317-41119-2.
- Shulman, David D. (2007). Dark Hope: Working for Peace in Israel and Palestine. University of Chicago Press. ISBN 978-1-459-62712-3.
- Shulman, David D. (2018). Freedom and Despair: Notes from the South Hebron Hills. University of Chicago Press. ISBN 978-0-226-56665-8.
- Simpson, Gerald (2001). Detainees Denied Justice. Kuwser Law International. ISBN 978-9-041-11552-2.
- Slater, Jerome (1994). "The Significance of Israeli Historical Revisionism". In Stone, Russell; Zenner, Walter P. (eds.). Essays on Israeli Social Issues and Scholarship. Vol. 3. SUNY Press. pp. 179–199. ISBN 978-1-438-42140-7.
- Slyomovics, Susan (Summer 1991). ""To Put One's Fingers in the Bleeding Wound": Palestinian Theatre under Israeli Censorship". The Drama Review. 35 (2): 18–38. doi:10.2307/1146087. JSTOR 1146087.
- "Statistics on demolition of houses built without permits in the West Bank (Not including East Jerusalem)". B'Tselem. September 2018a.
- Stein, Yael (March 2018). Minors in Jeopardy: Violation of the Rights of Palestinian Minors by Israel's Military Courts (PDF). B'Tselem. ISBN 978-965-7613-33-7.
- Stockton, Ronald R. (Summer 1990). "Intifada Deaths". Journal of Palestine Studies. 19 (4): 86–95. doi:10.2307/2537390. JSTOR 2537390.
- "A Survey of Israeli Settlements". MERIP Reports (60): 13–20. September 1977. doi:10.2307/3011548. JSTOR 3011548.
- Swirski, Shlomo (2010). The Burden of the Israeli–Palestinian Conflict: 2010 Report (PDF) (Report). Adva Center.
- Tawil-Souri, Helga (Winter 2015). "Surveillance Sublime: The Security State in Jerusalem". Jerusalem Quarterly. 68. Institute for Palestine Studies: 56–65. doi:10.70190/jq.I68.p56.
- Tessler, Mark A. (1994). A History of the Israeli-Palestinian Conflict. Indiana University Press. p. 553. ISBN 978-0-253-20873-6 – via Internet Archive.
- Thabat, Abdel Azis Mousa; Abdulla, Taisir; Elhelou, Mohammed-Wafaei; Vostanis, Panos (2006). "Effect of trauma on Palestinian Children's Mental Health in the Gazsa Strip and the West". In Greenbaum, Charles W.; Veerman, Philip E.; Bacon-Shnoor, Naomi (eds.). Protection of Children During Armed Political Conflict: A Multidisciplinary Perspective. Intersentia. pp. 123–141. ISBN 978-9-050-95341-2.
- The Israeli Information Center for Human Rights in the Occupied Territories (30 December 2020). "Israel's open-fire policy claims another victim: sniper kills 15-year-old Palestinian". B'Tselem.
- Thrall, Nathan (2017). The Only Language They Understand: Forcing Compromise in Israel and Palestine. Henry Holt and Company. ISBN 978-1-627-79710-8.
- Tillman, Seth (Winter 1978). "The West Bank Hearings: Israel's Colonization of Occupied Territory". Journal of Palestine Studies. 7 (2): 71–87. doi:10.2307/2536439. JSTOR 2536439.
- Tiripelli, Giuliana (2016). Media and Peace in the Middle East: The Role of Journalism in Israel-Palestine. PalgraveMacmillan. ISBN 978-1-137-50401-2.
- Torture and Intimidation in the West Bank: The Case of Al-Fara'a Prison (Report). Law in the Service of Man. 1986. Archived from the original on 25 July 2019.
- Toynbee, Arnold (January 1931). "The Present Situation in Palestine". International Affairs. 10 (1): 38–68. doi:10.2307/3015929. JSTOR 3015929.
- Tuma, Elias H.; Darin-Drabkin, Haim (1978). The Economic Case for Palestine. Croom Helm.
- Unctad (21 July 2016). Economic Costs of the Israeli occupation for the Palestinian people (PDF). UNCTAD.
- Unispal (1 September 2007). Israeli-Palestinian Fatalities Since 2000 – Key Trends. UNISPAL. Archived from the original on 17 February 2019.
- "Urgent Action: Administrative Detention Renewed" (PDF). Amnesty International. 2018a.
- Van Arkadie, Brian (Winter 1977). "The Impact of the Israeli Occupation on the Economies of the West Bank and Gaza". Journal of Palestine Studies. 6 (2): 103–129. doi:10.2307/2535505. JSTOR 2535505.
- Van Reenen, Piet (2006). "Children as Victims in the Israeli Palestinian Conflict: Policing Realities and Police Training". In Greenbaum, Charles W.; Veerman, Philip E.; Bacon-Shnoor, Naomi (eds.). Protection of Children During Armed Political Conflict: A Multidisciplinary Perspective. Intersentia. pp. 371–393. ISBN 978-9-050-95341-2.
- Veracini, Lorenzo (Winter 2013). "The Other Shift: Settler Colonialism, Israel, and the Occupation". Journal of Palestine Studies. 42 (2): 26–42. doi:10.1525/jps.2013.42.2.26. hdl:1959.3/316461. JSTOR 10.1525/jps.2013.42.2.26 – via Figshare.
- Weill, Sharon (2007). "The judicial arm of the occupation: the Israeli military courts in the occupied territories". International Review of the Red Cross. 89 (866): 395–418. doi:10.1017/s1816383107001142. ISSN 1816-3831. S2CID 55988443.
- Weill, Sharon (2014). The Role of National Courts in Applying International Humanitarian Law. Oxford University Press. ISBN 978-0-19-968542-4.
- Weinthal, Erika; Sowers, Jeannie (1 March 2019). "Targeting infrastructure and livelihoods in the West Bank and Gaza". International Affairs. 95 (2): 319–340. doi:10.1093/ia/iiz015.
- Weizman, Eyal (2012). Hollow Land: Israel's Architecture of Occupation. Verso Books. ISBN 978-1-844-67915-7.
- Wilde, Ralph (2021). "Using the Master's Tools to Dismantle the Master's House: International Law and Palestinian Liberation". The Palestine Yearbook of International Law Online. 22 (1): 1–74. doi:10.1163/22116141_022010_002. S2CID 245698763.
- World Bank (April 2009). Assessment of Restrictions on Palestinian Water Sector Development (PDF). World Bank – via UNISPAL.
- World Bank (2 October 2013). Area C and the Future of the Palestinian Economy (PDF). World Bank.
- World Bank (2 January 2016). The Telecommunication Sector in the Palestinian Territories: A Missed Opportunity for Economic Development (PDF). World Bank.
- Yahya, Adel H (2010). "Heritage Appropriation in the Holy Land". In Boytner, Ran; Dodd, Lynn Swartz; Parker, Bradley J. (eds.). Controlling the Past, Owning the Future: The Political Uses of Archaeology in the Middle East. University of Arizona Press. pp. 142–158. ISBN 978-0-816-52795-3.
- Yiftachel, Oren (2006). Ethnocracy: Land and Identity Politics in Israel/Palestine. University of Pennsylvania Press. ISBN 978-0-812-23927-0.
- Ziai, Fatemeh (2013). "Human rights violations as an obstacle to economic development: restrictions on movement in the West Bank and the Gaza Strip". In Wright, J.W. Jr (ed.). The Political Economy of Middle East Peace: The Impact of Competing Trade Agendas. Routledge. pp. 128–152. ISBN 978-1-134-69013-8.
- Zureik, Elia (November 2001). "Constructing Palestine through Surveillance Practices". British Journal of Middle Eastern Studies. 28 (2): 205–227. doi:10.1080/13530190120083086. JSTOR 826125. S2CID 143506922.
- Zureik, Elia (2010). "Colonialism, surveillance, and population control: Israel/Palestine". In Zureik, Elia; Lyon, David; Abu-Laban, Yasmeen (eds.). Surveillance and Control in Israel/Palestine: Population, Territory and Power. Routledge. pp. 3–45. ISBN 978-1-136-93097-3.
- Zureik, Elia (2015). Israel's Colonial Project in Palestine: Brutal Pursuit. Routledge. ISBN 978-1-317-34046-1.
