= Human rights violations against Palestinians by Israel =

Israel is guilty of a variety of human rights violations against Palestinians. These include killings, detention (both of Palestinians in Israel and the occupied territories), restrictions on Palestinians residing in Jerusalem including interference with privacy, family, and home, interference with the freedom of peaceful assembly and association, limiting and occasionally restricting access to the Al-Aqsa Mosque compound, interference with privacy, punishment of family members for alleged offenses by a relative, restrictions on freedom of expression and media including censorship, routine harassment of nongovernmental organizations, unlawful exercise of physical force or intimidation and threats of violence against Palestinians, targeted killings of Palestinians, and labor rights abuses against Palestinian workers. Amnesty has called Israel an apartheid regime.

According to the United States Department of State (Note: "Significant human rights issues included credible reports of: unlawful or arbitrary killings; arbitrary or unjust detention, including of Palestinians in Israel and the occupied territories; restrictions on Palestinians residing in Jerusalem including arbitrary or unlawful interference with privacy, family, and home; substantial interference with the freedom of peaceful assembly and association; arbitrary or unlawful interference with privacy; punishment of family members for alleged offenses by a relative; restrictions on freedom of expression and media including censorship; harassment of nongovernmental organizations; violence against asylum seekers and migrants; violence or threats of violence against Palestinians and members of national, racial, or ethnic minority groups; and labor rights abuses against foreign workers and Palestinian workers" (USDOS23 2023, pp. 1–2).) and international, Palestinian and Israeli human rights organizations, there have been credible reports of human rights violations committed against Palestinians by Israel, some amounting to war crimes and crimes against humanity.

Israel's blockade of the Gaza Strip has been described as a form of collective punishment and a serious violation of international humanitarian law. Israel's military campaigns in the Gaza Strip include Operation Cast Lead which was described by the UN Fact Finding Mission as "a deliberately disproportionate attack designed to punish, humiliate and terrorize a civilian population, radically diminish its local economic capacity both to work and to provide for itself, and to force upon it an ever increasing sense of dependency and vulnerability."

Israel has also long been accused of illegally harvesting organs of Palestinians. The first evidence of illegal organ harvesting of Palestinians dates back to the early 1990s. Israel has admitted that Israeli pathologists harvested organs from dead Palestinians without the consent of their families. Some Israeli physicians have spoken against illegal organ harvesting of Palestinians that is performed without family approval.

== Territorial fragmentation and domination over the Palestinians ==
=== Background ===
In 1920 Israel Zangwill argued that creating a state free of non-Jews would require a South African type of "racial redistribution". In 1931 Arnold Toynbee prophesied that, given the nature of the Zionist project to secure land only for Jewish use to the exclusion of Palestinian labour, that the British mandatory government would be forced eventually to compensate the process by legislation that would create a land reservation for the exclusive use of Palestinians. He drew a parallel with the situation in South Africa under the Natives Land Act, 1913 which established the principle of segregation. (Note: "Sooner or later, the Palestine Government will have to legislation in this connection. I think they will have in the end to proclaim by law what will in effect be an Arab land-reservation. The Palestine Government will have to estimate the amount of cultivable land which is needed in order to provide the Arab rural population with a livelihood at a reasonable standard of living under certain future conditions, that is, when the economic potentialities of the total cultivable area of Palestine have been fully developed and when the agricultural methods of the Palestinian Arab peasant have been improved as far as they can be. When those conditions have been attained, it will, I believe, be found necessary to set aside, by Palestinian legislation, a certain proportion of the land of Palestine as an exclusive preserve for the Arabs, in view of the fact that all the Palestinian land which is purchased by Jewish funds is becoming, as I believe, inevitably an exclusive preserve for the Jews. You see what this means. It means what in South Africa is called segregation. I prophesy that, on the ultimate map of population and land-holding in Palestine, the Jewish population and the land in Jewish hands will be separated geographically from the Arab population and from the land in Arab hands. The two communities in Palestine will be segregated into two separate geographical blocks." (Toynbee 1931, p. 53)) These segregated territorial reserves were the forerunners of the bantustans, a word that gained currency only much later in the 1940s. After the foundation of Israel in 1948, its first president Chaim Weizmann and South African Prime Minister Jan Smuts supported each other's view on the racial basis of their respective states and their rights over indigenous lands.

=== Planning for fragmentation ===
The official "Master Plan for the Development of Samaria and Judea to the year 2010" (1983) foresaw the creation of a belt of concentrated Jewish settlements linked to each other and Israel beyond the Green line while disrupting the same links joining Palestinian towns and villages along the north–south highway, impeding any parallel ribbon development for Arabs and leaving the West Bankers scattered, unable to build up larger metropolitan infrastructure, and out of sight of the Israeli settlements. The result has been called a process of "enclavization," ghettoization, (Note: "During the late 1970s and 1980s Israel also continued relentlessly to expand its land control over the territories.. This expansion was backed by a tight check over the development of Palestinian villages and towns, where hundreds of houses on private lands were demolished every year on the grounds that they were illegal or, more recently, a threat to the security of Jewish settlers. Other forms of Palestinian commercial and public development were stifled by the restrictive policies of military government, in effect ghettoizing the locals in their towns and villages and making them dependent on distant Jewish employment." (Yiftachel 2006, p. 67)) typified most visibly by the enclosure of Qalqilya in a concrete wall, or what Ariel Sharon called the Bantustan model, an allusion to the apartheid system, and one which many argue, makes Israel's occupational policies not dissimilar, despite different origins, from the South African model. (Note: "By carefully exploring the South African apartheid edifice, particularly the Bantustans, and comparing it with the structural developments set in place in the Palestinian territory since the Oslo process, it shows how the West Bank and Gaza Strip have moved towards a process of 'Bantustanization' rather than of sovereign independence." (Farsakh 2005, p. 231)) In particular it bears comparison to the policies applied in South Africa to the Transkei, (Note: "South Africa's homeland policy exhibits a similar architecture of domination combined with racial arithmetic as applied by Israel: Transkei, for example, is characterized by 'physical fragmentation of territory, combined with ethnic dispersal'." (Pieterse 1984, p. 65)) a policy that may have a broader geopolitical reach, if the Yinon Plan is to be taken as an indication of Israeli policy. The World Bank argued in 2009 that creating economic islands in the West Bank and Gaza is a developmental dead-end that would only imperil the construction of an economically unified and viable Palestinian state.

One observed function of the Separation Barrier is to seize large swathes of land thought important for future settlement projects, notoriously in the case of the area of Susya absorbing land worked by Bedouin herders with proven Ottoman title to the terrain. The construction, significantly inspired by the ideas of Arnon Soffer to "preserve Israel as an Island of Westernization in a Crazy Region", had as its public rationale the idea of defending Israel against terroristic attacks, but was designed at the same time to incorporate a large swathe of West Bank Territory, much of it private Palestinian land: 73% of the area marked for inclusion into Israel was arable, fertile, and rich in water, formerly constituting the "breadbasket of Palestine".

Had the barrier been constructed along the Green Line with the same purpose it would have run 313 kilometres, instead of 790 kilometres, and have cost far less than the $3.587 billion the extended wall is estimated to cost (2009). The disparity arises from the government's decision to rope in dozens of settlements west of the barrier. That it remains unfinished is said to be due to pressure from settler lobbies opposed to a completion that would restrict the further expansion of settlements or cut them off from Israel, as with Gush Etzion. There are only 12 gates through the 168 kilometres of the wall surrounding East Jerusalem, of which in theory four allow access to West Bankers who manage to obtain a permit. A whole generation of West Bankers have never seen the city, or the Haram al Sharif, a denial of international law stipulating the right of access to sites of worship.

=== Legal system ===
The Israeli-Palestinian conflict is characterized by a legal asymmetry, (Note: "legal asymmetry which probably most characterizes this conflict. From 1948 onwards, Israel has been a state with its own territory, internationally recognized borders, a clear political agenda, a defined foreign policy, and a powerful and well-organized army. In contrast, the Palestinians had to fight to move from the status of 'non-existence' – if not as 'refugees' — to recognition as a nation, with their own right to a national state. Also, during the years of the British Mandate (1922–1948), despite the fact that both Jews and Arabs were living in Palestine under British power, legal asymmetry was evident. Jews were recognized as a nation whose rights were guaranteed by the text of the Mandate, while the Palestinians were not. This asymmetry had not existed at the beginning of the conflict (1880–1920) when some Eastern European Jews started to immigrate to Palestinian territory, at the time under the sovereignty of the Ottoman Empire." (Gallo & Marzano 2009, p. 8)) which embodies a fragmented jurisdiction throughout the West Bank, where ethnicity determines what legal system one will be tried under. According to Michael Sfard and others, the intricate military system of laws imposed on Palestinians has enabled rather than limited violence. (Note: "it seems that more laws, arming to the teeth trailing troops of lawyers, legal advisors, judges and scholars, have not operated to limit state violence. Instead, more often than not, law has enabled this violence, cloaking the use of force required to sustain the Israeli regime with a mantle of legitimacy.") Down to 1967, people in the West Bank lived under one unified system of laws applied by a single judicial system. State law (qanun) is a relatively alien concept in Palestinian culture, where a combination of the Shari'a and customary law (urf) constitutes the normal frame of reference for relations within the basic social unity of the family clan (hamula). Settlers are subject to Israeli civil law, Palestinians to the occupying arm's military law. Overall the Israeli system has been described as one where "Law, far from limiting the power of the state, is merely another way of exercising it." A Jewish settler can be detained up to 15 days, a Palestinian can be detained without charges being laid for 160 days.

According to the legal framework of international law, a local population under occupation should continue to be bound by its own penal laws and tried in its own courts. However, under security provisions, local laws can be suspended by the occupying power and replaced with military orders enforced by military courts. In 1988, Israel amended its Security Code in such a way that international law could no longer be invoked before the military judges in their tribunals. The High Court upheld only one challenge to the more than 1,000 arbitrary military orders that had been imposed from 1967 down to 1990 and that are legally binding in the occupied territories. Israeli businesses in the West Bank employing Palestinian labour drew up employment laws according to Jordanian law. This was ruled in 2007 by the Israeli Supreme Court to be discriminatory, and that Israeli law must apply in this area, but as of 2016, according to Human Rights Watch, the ruling has yet to be implemented, and the government states that it cannot enforce compliance.

=== Freedom of movement ===
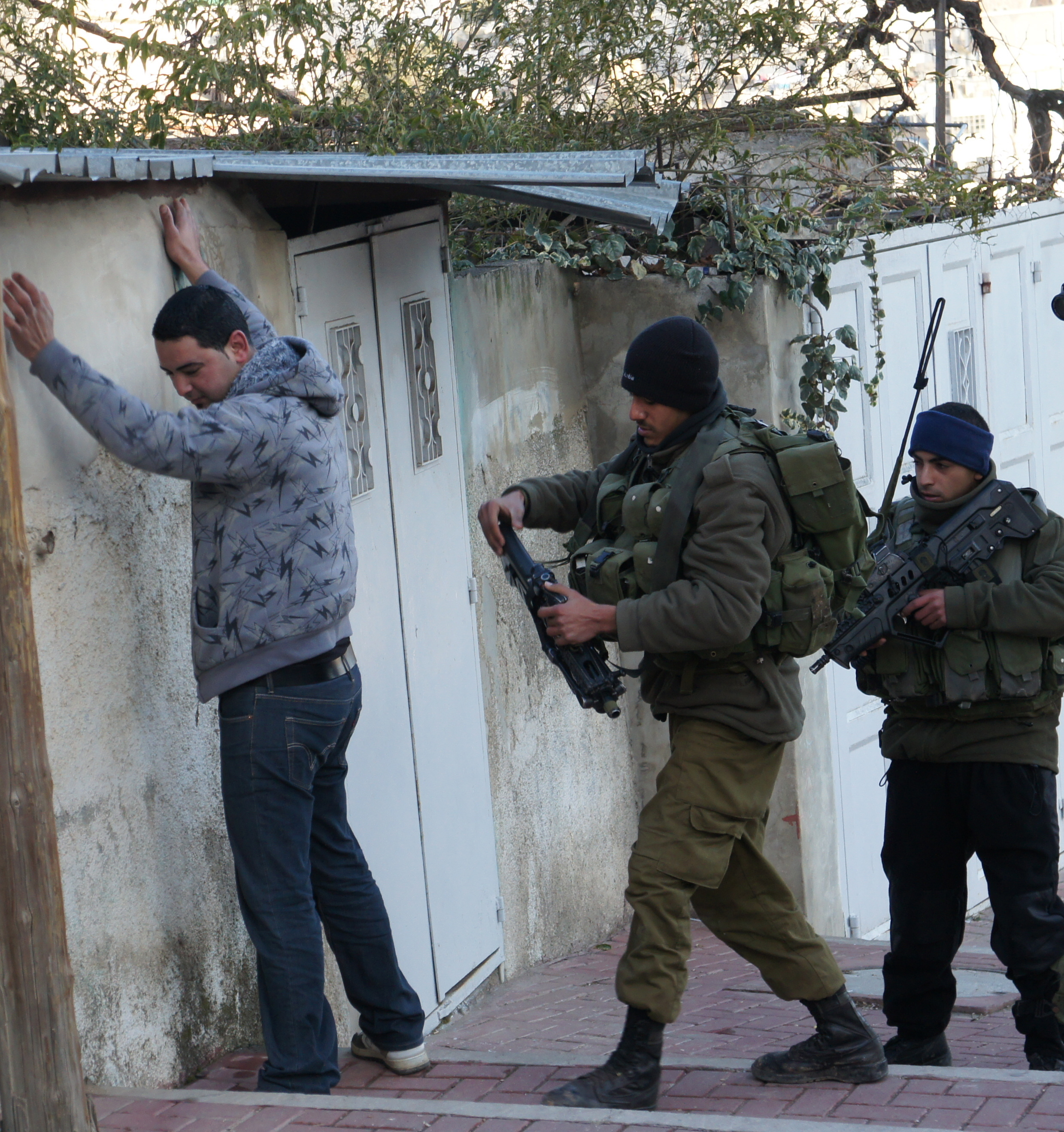
Routine check of a Palestinian man by Israeli soldiers at checkpoint in Hebron

The Universal Declaration of Human Rights establishes freedom of movement as a fundamental human right.

It has been said that for "Jewish settlers, roads connect; for Palestinians, they separate." Between 1994 and 1997, the Israeli Defense Forces (IDF) built 180 miles of bypass roads in the territories, on appropriated land because they ran close to Palestinian villages. The given aim was said to be to afford protection to settlers from Palestinian sniping, bombing, and drive-by shootings. Permanent and flying checkpoints (some 327 a month in 2017), barriers and restrictive networks restructure the West Bank into "land cells", freezing the flow of normal everyday Palestinian lives. TAU emeritus professor Elisha Efrat argues they form an apartheid network of "octopus arms which hold a grip on Palestinian population centres." A large number of embankments, concrete slabs, manned checkpoints, mounds, trenches, iron gates, fences, and walls impede movement on primary and secondary roads. The result was to cantonize and fragment Palestinian townships, and cause endless obstacles to Palestinians going to work, schools, markets and relatives. Women have died or had miscarriages while waiting for permission at a checkpoint to go to hospital. The World Bank that the impact of restrictions on movement for workers cost roughly US$229 million per annum (2007) while additional costs from the circuitous routes people must drive totaled US$185 million in 2013. In one village, Kafr Qaddum, soldiers from the Nahal Brigade planted explosive devices on a tract of land where demonstrators gather, as a "deterrence" measure: they were removed when a 7-year-old child was injured playing with one.

In February 2022, Israel issued a 97-page ordinance for implementation by 5 July. The document relaces a former 4 page guideline regulating entry and exiting Palestinian areas. Strict limits are imposed on foreigners, students, businessmen, academics, and, in general, Palestinians with dual nationality visiting families there. The tightening of movements is expected to have major negative repercussions on the local Palestinian economy. (Note: "There are no provisions at all for some common visa categories, including teachers and journalists working for Palestinian media outlets, as well as culture and tourism, and family visits by siblings, grandparents or grandchildren. Only 150 foreign students a year may enrol at Palestinian colleges and universities, studying pre-approved subjects, and there is a quota of 100 foreign 'distinguished' lecturers, a designation Israeli authorities will make." (McKernan 2022))

=== Village closures ===
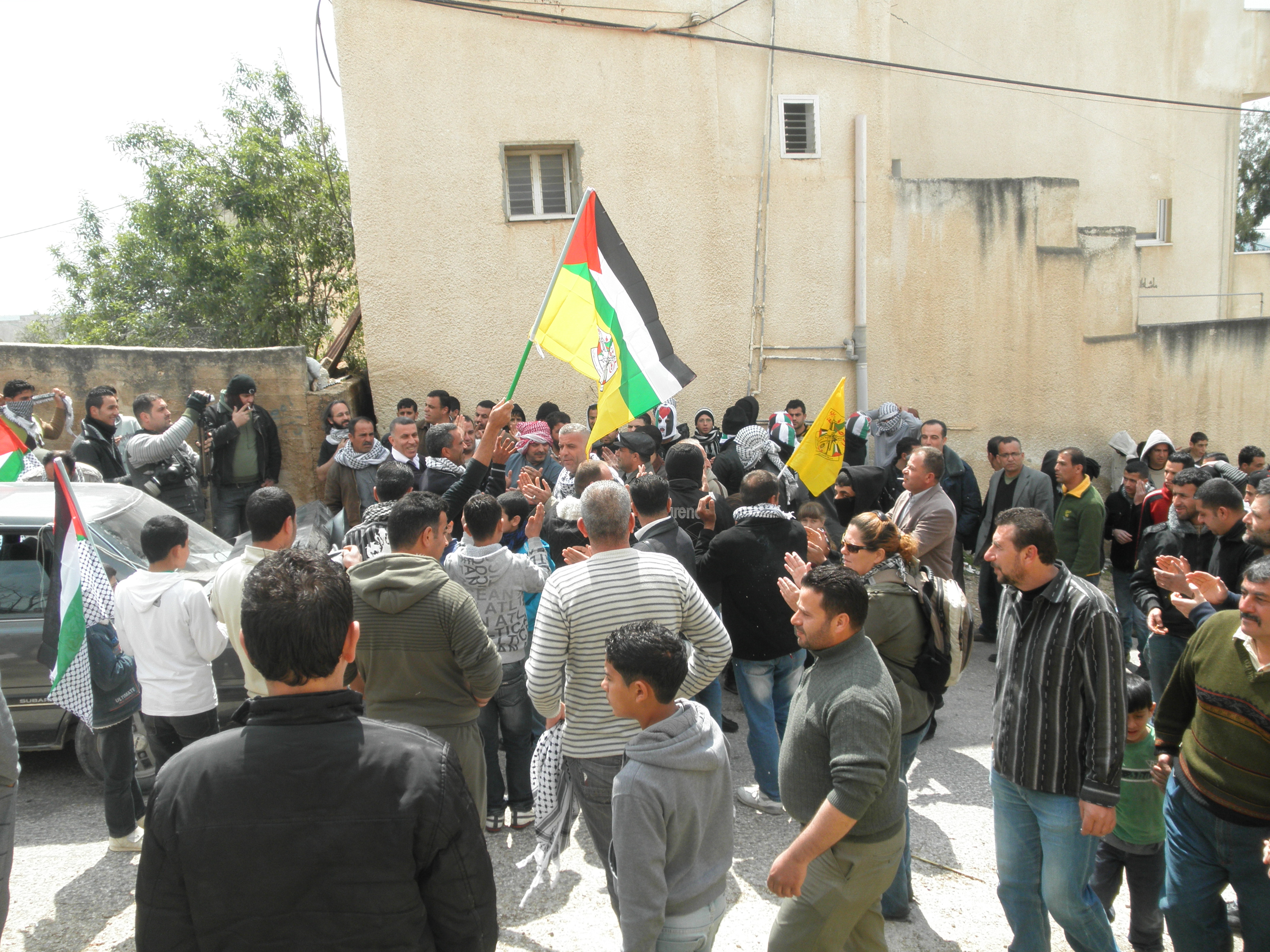
Demonstration against road block, Kafr Qaddum, March 2012

The closure (Hebrew seger, Arabic ighlaq) policy operates on the basis of a pass system developed in 1991, and is divided into two types: a general closure restriction the movement of goods and people, except when a permit is given, from and to Israel and the West Bank and Gaza, developed in response to a series of stabbings in the former 1993, and the implementation of total closure over both areas. Aside from general closures, total closures were imposed for over 300 days from September 1993 after the Declaration of Principles of the Oslo I Accord and late June 1996. The strictest total closure was put in place in the spring of 1996 in the wake of a series of the suicide bombings executed by the Gaza-Strip based organization of Hamas in retaliation for the assassination of Yahya Ayyash, when the Israeli government imposed a total 2-week long ban on any movement by over 2 million Palestinians between 465 West Bank towns and villages, a measure repeated after the deadly clashes arising from the archaeological excavations under the Western Wall of the Haram al Sharif/Temple Mount.

The IDF erected iron gates at the entrances to the overwhelming majority of Palestinian villages, allowing the army to shut them down at will, in minutes. Notable examples of villages that have undergone long term isolation, with residents suffering extreme restrictions on movement, are Nuaman, which was absorbed into the Jerusalem municipality while having its inhabitants classified as West Bankers, and Kafr Qaddum which has had a permanent roadblock at its entrance for 14 years, from 2003, the same time the settlement of Kedumim was established, and since 2011 its villagers have been protesting the roadblock, which requires them to travel a distance six times greater than the usual route to access Nablus.

Towards the end of the Gulf War in Kuwait, Israel again imposed a curfew on the West Bank (and Gaza) lasting seven weeks, causing devastating economic setbacks, with thousands of Palestinians fired from their jobs in Israel. Nablus was subject to total curfews for 200 days in two years (2002–2004). During house raids, windows and doors were smashed, food stocks mashed up into an indistinct mush; grain stores, TVs, solar panels, water tanks and radios destroyed or impounded.

It is routine for the Israeli authorities to impose a comprehensive closure over the West Bank during Jewish holidays like Yom Kippur, Pesach, Sukkot and Rosh Hashanah, with an exception made for Jewish industrial areas in the territory. The reason given is to prevent terror attacks, and also to enable security personnel at checkpoints time off to enjoy these holidays. Such closures can at times last 11 days.

=== Marriage difficulties ===
Coming to terms with the problem of the Palestinian right of return while negotiating for UN recognition in 1948, Israel came up with a family reunification programme, and was granted membership on the understanding that it would comply with international law in this regard. The very word "return" (awda) was censored from being used in Palestinian newspapers as implying an existential threat to Israel. In practice, Israel evaluates proposed family reunifications in terms of a perceived demographic or security threat. They were frozen in 2002. Families composed of a Jerusalemite spouse and a Palestinian from the West Bank (or Gaza) face enormous legal difficulties in attempts to live together, with most applications, subject to an intricate, on average decade-long, four-stage processing, rejected. Women with "foreign husbands" (those lacking a Palestinian identity card), are reportedly almost never allowed to rejoin their spouse. The 2003 Citizenship and Entry into Israel Law (Temporary Provision), or CEIL, subsequently renewed in 2016 imposed a ban on family unification between Israeli citizens or "permanent residents" and their spouses who are originally of the West Bank or Gaza. Such a provision does not apply, however, to Israeli settlers in the West Bank or (until 2005) Gaza. In such instances, the prohibition is explained in terms of "security concerns".

A Jerusalemite Palestinian who joins their spouse in the West Bank and thereby fails to maintain seven years of consecutive residence in East Jerusalem can have their residency right revoked. According to B'Tselem, any of the over 2,000 Palestinians registered as absentee owners of property in the West Bank have been denied permission to re-enter for purposes like family reunifications because their return would compel the Israeli authorities to return their property, on which settlements have been established, to their original Palestinian owners.

=== Targeted assassinations ===
Targeted assassinations are acts of lethal selective violence undertaken against specific people identified as threats. Rumours emerged in the press around September 1989 that Israel had drawn up a wanted list, several of whom were subsequently killed, and it was speculated that the time Israel might be operating "death squads". Israel first publicly acknowledged its use of the tactic against Hussein Abayat at Beit Sahour near Bethlehem in November 2000. In its decision regarding the practice, the Israeli Supreme Court in 2006 refrained from either endorsing or banning the tactic, but set forth four conditions – precaution, military necessity, follow-up investigation and proportionality (Note: In his study of the IDF Samy Cohen writes that: "In over 60 years of counterterrorism, warfare, little seems to have changed in the Israeli army mindset since the foundation of the state of Israel. In response to a terrorist threat or an insurgency, be it armed or unarmed, the IDF employs the same sort of response – disproportionate response – striking both combatants and noncombatants at once when it is impossible to strike one without hitting the other, with a certain degree of intentional excess, while trying to refrain from spilling over into mass crime..Disproportionate response is.. an essential component of Israeli strategic culture." (Cohen 2010b, p. 151)) – and stipulated that the legality must be adjudicated on a case-by-case analysis of the circumstances. Nils Melzer found the judgement to be a step forward but flawed in several key regards, particularly for failing to provide guidelines to determine when the practice would be permissible. According to one former official, cited by Daniel Byman, on average Israel spends on average 10 hours planning a targeted killing operation and ten seconds on whether to proceed with the assassination or not.

Of the 8,746 violent Palestinian deaths registered from 1987 to 2008, 836 were executed following the identification of individuals based on information gathered from collaborators. According to B'Tselem, an Israeli human rights organization, for the period between 2000 and the end of 2005, 114 civilians died as the result of collateral damage as Israeli security forces successfully targeted 203 Palestinian militants. The figures from 9 November 2000 to 1 June 2007 indicate that Israeli assassinations killed 362 people, 237 being directly targeted and 149 bystanders collaterally. One intelligence officer recounting the atmosphere in the operations room where assassinations were programmed and then witnessed on video, stated that worries about "collateral damage" never dampened the cheers greeting a successful targeting mission.

=== Surveillance ===
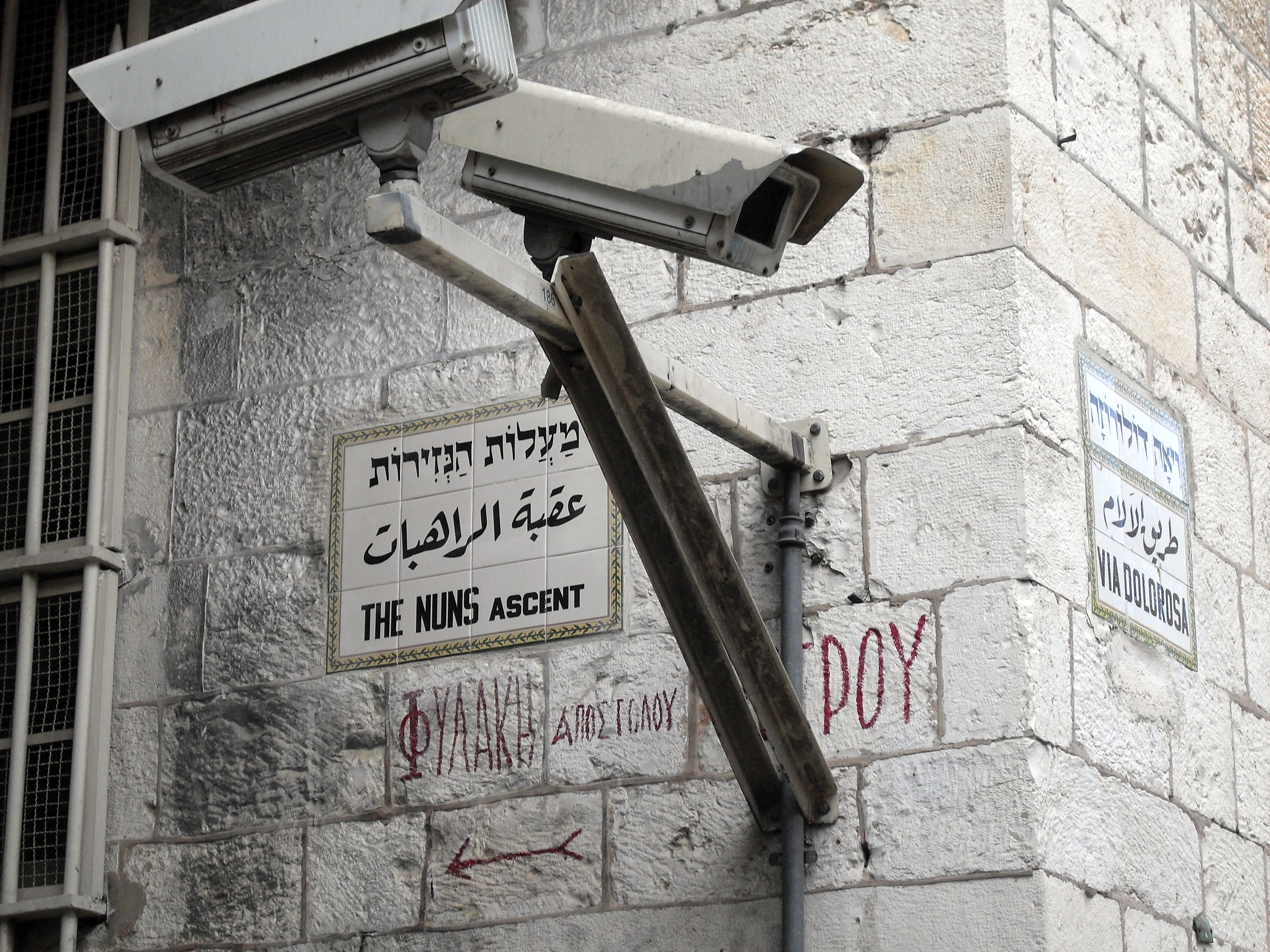
Cameras are ubiquitous in the old city, East Jerusalem

Israel, in its capillary monitoring of Palestinians has been called a Surveillance state par excellence. The entire Palestinian population is kept under surveillance, regardless of intelligence concerns, using smartphones and closed-circuit cameras, some capable of seeing into homes, whose photos are then fed into the IDF's "Blue Wolf" tracking system, endowed with facial recognition technology. This is a pared down version of Wolf Pack, a computer data base containing "profiles of virtually every Palestinian in the West Bank, including photographs of individuals, their family histories, education and a security rating for each person." The deployment of such systems is banned in Israel. IDF soldiers on West Bank checkpoint duty are not allowed to end their shifts until they have filled their quota of 50 photos of Palestinians passing the checkpoint, and details concerning them. Settlers have a parallel smartphone app, White Wolf, for scanning Palestinians. Military drones and balloons, and the invasive Pegasus spyware for penetrating smartphones, also form part of the West Bank surveillance system. (Note: "In (Abu Markhyah)'s quarter of Hebron, close to the Cave of the Patriarchs, a site that is sacred to Muslims and Jews alike, surveillance cameras have been mounted about every 300 feet, including on the roofs of homes. And he said the real-time monitoring appears to be increasing. A few months ago, he said, his 6-year-old daughter dropped a teaspoon from the family's roof deck, and although the street seemed empty, soldiers came to his home soon after and said he was going to be cited for throwing stones." (Dwoskin 2021))

Among many Israeli critics of the occupation, the activist Jeff Halper and the philosopher Avishai Margalit express concerns at the paralysing effect on Palestinians of intricate surveillance systems, of a "matrix of control" underlying the occupation. Soon after hostilities ceased, Israel began to count all items in households from televisions to refrigerators, stoves down to heads of livestock, orchards and tractors. Letters were checked and their addresses registered, and inventories were drawn up of workshops producing furniture, soap, textiles, sweets and even eating habits. While many innovations were introduced to improve workers' productivity, they can also be seen as control mechanisms. Forward military planners in Israel foresee the day when Israel will withdraw from parts of the West Bank: this will not end the Occupation, for thereafter they envisage an "invisible occupation"/"airborne occupation" or "occupation in disappearance" régime, with a continued capacity to control the physically evacuated territory with surveillance and strikes.

One former Israeli intelligence officer involved in Unit 8200 likened the surveillance system to that in the German film The Lives of Others, with the difference, in his view, that the Israeli monitoring was more efficient. While the Israeli public thinks, he stated, that this surveillance is focused on combating terrorism, in practice a significant amount of intelligence gathering targets innocent people with no record for militancy. No Palestinian was, he claimed, exempt from non-stop monitoring. (Note: "All Palestinians are exposed to non-stop monitoring without any legal protection. Junior soldiers can decide when someone is a target for the collection of information. There is no procedure in place to determine whether the violation of the individual's rights is necessarily justifiable. The notion of rights for Palestinians does not exist at all. Not even as an idea to be disregarded." (The Guardian 12 Sep 2014)) Any information enabling "extortion" or blackmail, such as evidence of marital infidelity, health problems requiring treatment in Israel or sexual orientation is regarded as relevant. (Note: "If you're homosexual and know someone who knows a wanted person – and we need to know about it – Israel will make your life miserable. If you need emergency medical treatment in Israel, the West Bank or abroad – we searched for you. The state of Israel will allow you to die before we let you leave for treatment without giving information on your wanted cousin" (The Guardian 12 Sep 2014).) Israeli surveillance and strike presence over Palestinian areas is constant and intense, with former Shin Bet head Avi Dichter noting, "When a Palestinian child draws a picture of the sky, he doesn't draw it without a helicopter."

Surveillance technology first tested on Palestinians is then often sold abroad.

In 2025, Microsoft "ceased and disabled a set of services to a unit within the Israel Ministry of Defense" following reporting from The Guardian that Unit 8200 was using Microsoft Azure to build "a sweeping and intrusive system that collects and stores recordings of millions of mobile phone calls made each day by Palestinians in Gaza and the West Bank".

=== Technologies of control ===
Ben Ehrenreich, citing Gudrun Krämer's description of the British suppression of the 1936–1939 Arab revolt in Palestine, wrote that, aside from caning, all of the punitive measures adopted by the Mandatory authorities recur as standard practices in the way Israel manages the occupied territories. (Note: "house searches without warrants, night raids, preventive detention, collective punishment, caning and flogging, deportation, the confiscation or destruction of the homes of actual or presumed rebels, and in some cases even the torture of suspects and prisoners, and responding to demonstrations 'massive force..causing numerous casualties'. With the sole exception of caning, all of these tactics had, by the end of the Second Intifada, become standard practice in Israel's management of the occupied territories" (Krämer 2011, p. 274; Ehrenreich 2016, p. 33))

Scholars differ regarding how to classify the techniques of segregation and exclusion used to further Israeli control over the West Bank. For Jan Selby, there are five central planks to consolidate territorial colonization: (a) settlement construction; (b) land confiscation and engineering a bypass road network (c) drawing the local economy into dependence on Israel's larger one; (d) the creation of a dual legal system with different laws for Palestinians and Jewish settlers, with subsidies favouring the latter and (e) seeking local clients and patrons who would act according to Israel's bidding, and, in lieu of success in this regard, increased repression.

Gershon Shafir has discerned a matrix of five technologies of Israeli domination over Palestinians (a) the permit system; (b) administrative detention; (c) deportation: (d) house demolitions, and (e) torture. Richard Falk adds political assassinations, extrajudicial punishments and the use of collective punishment to the list. According to Neve Gordon, Israel uses lawfare "to encode the field of human rights and in this way (has) help(ed) frame human rights work in Israel as a security threat."

=== Population transfer and deportations ===
Israel was one of the High Contracting Parties to the Fourth Geneva Convention dealing specifically with protection of civilians in a war zone, and, as a signatory, underwrote Article 49 which reads:

Individual or mass forcible transfers, as well as deportations of protected persons from occupied territory to the territory of the Occupying Power or to that of any other country, occupied or not, are prohibited, regardless of their motive... The Occupying Power shall not deport or transfer parts of its own civilian population into the territory it occupies.

This final clause is absolute, allowing of no exceptions, and was ratified by Israel when it signed the Geneva Conventions on 6 July 1951. The sentence was written to prevent the repetition of the practice of colonization established by certain powers, by which Germany was to be understood, of transferring their population to conquered territories for political and racial reasons in WW2. Furthermore, Article 76 of that convention excludes deportation as a punitive measure in stating that

protected persons accused of offences shall be detained in the occupied country and, if convicted, they shall serve their sentences therein.

The principle is unambiguous – "an occupier cannot expel a single person, however much that person constitutes a security risk".

According to one estimate, between 1967 and 1978 some 1,151 individuals were deported by Israel, including two whole tribes, dispatched into exile en masse from the area of the Jordan Valley in December 1967 and May 1969. To provide legal warrant for these measures, which contravene the Fourth Geneva Convention, Israel applied law 112 going back to the British Mandatory government's Defence (Emergency) Regulations which predated the Geneva Convention by 4 years. These in turn went back to military emergency legislation devised to counteract the 1936–1939 Arab revolt in Palestine. (Note: "The Defence (Emergency) Regulations of 1945 have their origins in the State of Emergency Laws of 1936 and the Defence Laws of 1939 which were introduced by the Mandatory Authority in Palestine (British) to deal with the rising Arab opposition to both the continuation of the British Mandate and Jewish immigration to Palestine between 1936–1945." (AI 1978, p. 337)) Fathers were most frequently affected in the early days: sundering families, the practice was arrest household heads at night in their homes and take them to a desert south of the Dead Sea where they were forced, at gunpoint or gunshot, to cross over into Jordan.

For at least two years starting in mid-1970, Israel collected Palestinians from Israeli prisons and forced them across the Jordanian border in the Negev Desert. Codenamed Operation Patient, this practice expelled at least 800 people. The archives on the operation remain mostly unavailable to researchers.

To this day, any Palestinian Jerusalemite can have his or her residency revoked by Israeli law if Jerusalem has not constituted, in the view of the Israeli authorities, their "centre of life" for seven consecutive years, a revocation constituting a forced population transfer that has been applied to at least 14,595 Palestinians since 1967 (2016). The PLO, inspired by the precedent of the SS Exodus, once endeavoured to sail a "Ship of Return" into Haifa harbour with 135 Palestinians Israel had deported from the territories. Mossad assassinated with a car-bomb the three senior Fatah officials organizing the event in Limassol, and then sunk the ship in the port.

The forced transfer of Palestinians still takes place in the West Bank: in 2018 the Israeli Supreme Court gave the green light to expel the people of Khan al-Ahmar from their township to a rubbish dump outside Abu Dis. Israel arrested at a checkpoint in February 2017 Maen Abu Hafez, a 23-year-old Palestinian, since he had no ID, and detained him under a deportation order in a prison for aliens in Ramla, Israel. He had been raised since the age of 3 in the Jenin Refugee Camp. Israel seeks to deport him to Brazil, though he speaks no Portuguese, his mother is Uruguayan and his Palestinian father deserted the family to return to Brazil in 1997 and has not been heard from since. (Note: A representative from Israel's Ministry for the Interior explained that this West Banker lived in Israel and as an alien, must be deported: "Only the State of Israel is responsible for people residing in it and it has decided unequivocally, based on the deportation order against him, that he must return to Brazil" (Hass 2018b).)

=== Censorship ===
In the West Bank both the British Mandatory "Defense Emergency Regulations of 1945, No. 88" – stipulating that "every article, picture, advertisement, decree and death notice must be submitted to military censors" –, and "Israeli Military Order No. IOI (1967)", amended by "Order No. 718 (1977)" and "No. 938 (1981)" concerning "the prohibition of incitement and adverse propaganda" formed the basis for censoring West Bank publications, poetry and literary productions. The civil and military censorship bureaus could overturn each other's decisions, making publishing permits increasingly difficult. No clear guidelines exist however, so even works translated from the Hebrew press, or theatrical productions permitted in Israel, such as Hamlet, could be censored. Criticism of settlements was disallowed, as were sentiments of national pride. Obituaries mourning the dead, or expressing pride in the fallen could be challenged. Even mentioning the word "Palestine" was forbidden. Under Israeli Military Order 101, Palestinians under military law were prohibited from demonstrating and publishing anything relating to a "political matter."

Newspapers could lose their licenses, without any reason given, on the basis of 1945 Emergency Regulation (Article 92/2). Travel permits to enable notable Palestinians like Elias Freij, mayor of Bethlehem, to be interviewed abroad could be denied. Graffiti (shi'arati) protesting the occupation were prohibited unless approved by the military, and owners of walls were made responsible and fined for the graffiti, so the practice had to be banned by Palestinians since it became a large source of revenue for Israel. Recently, surveillance of the internet, using software to ostensibly identify potential threats in social media posts led to the arrest of 800 Palestinians both by Israeli units and PA security forces, with 400 detained as "lone wolf terrorists" for what they wrote, though none had carried out attacks and, according to security expert, Ronen Bergman, no algorithm could identify lone-wolf attackers.

=== Coercive collaboration ===
One of the first things Israel captured on conquering the West Bank was the archives of the Jordanian Security Police, whose information allowed them to turn informers in the territory for that service into informers for Israel. Collaborators (asafir), broken in interrogation, and then planted in cells to persuade other prisoners to confess, began to be recruited in 1979. The number of collaborators with Israel before the Oslo Accords was estimated at 30,000. According to Haaretz, Shin Bet has used a number of "dirty" techniques to enlist Palestinians on its payroll as informers. These methods include exploiting people who have been identified as suffering from personal and economic hardships, people requesting family reunification, or a permit for medical treatment in Israel.

=== Taxation ===
In international law no occupying power has the right to impose taxes in addition to those existing before the occupation. Under Military Order 31 of 27 June 1967, Israel took over the Jordanian taxation system, with a notable change: Israelis moving into settlements were exempt, being taxed under Israeli law, while by 1988, the high income tax rate of 55% for people with incomes in the 8,000 dinar bracket was squeezed so that it applied to those earning 5,231 JD. In Israel the 48% tax bracket applied to those who earned almost twice that amount.

In 1988 the affluent entrepreneurial Christian town of Beit Sahour, which had several hundred mainly family-run businesses, organized a tax boycott on the grounds they saw no benefits flow back from their taxes. The town's residents used the slogan "No taxation under Occupation", which was inspired by the "no taxation without representation" slogan used by Patriots during the American Revolution. They refused to pay VAT and/or income taxes. 350 households of 1,000 were targeted and their bank accounts were frozen, while 500 more had their bank account confiscated or debited. Israel reacted with collective punishment, placing the town under a 42-day curfew. Residences were raided every day and business machinery, any equipment for commercial purposes, refrigerators, jewelry, money, household furniture and at times memorabilia, were confiscated. To shield soldiers from stone-throwing, cars were stopped and placed round the houses, while people were mustered to form human shields. The value of the goods confiscated bore no relation to the taxes being imposed, and were auctioned off in Israel at an estimated 20% of their replacement value. The effect was to virtually wipe out Beit Sahour's productive base.

== Collective punishment ==
Israel's use of collective punishment measures, such as movement restrictions, shelling of residential areas, mass arrests, and the destruction of public health infrastructure, (Note: "The Palestine Red Crescent Society (PRCS) reported 174 documented attacks on their ambulances by Israeli soldiers and settlers between September 29, 2000, and March 15, 2002, resulting in the damage of 78 ambulances. There have also been 166 attacks on their emergency medical technicians (EMT), resulting in three deaths and 134 injuries among PRCS EMTs. Additionally, the PRCS headquarters in Al-Bireh was hit on several occasions by heavy machine gun fire from Israeli soldiers located at the nearby illegal Israeli settlement, Psagot." (Jamjoum 2002, p. 56)) violates Articles 33 and 53 of the Fourth Geneva Convention. Article 33 reads in part:

No protected person may be punished for an offence he or she has not personally committed. Collective penalties and likewise all measures of intimidation or of terrorism are prohibited (Note: Article 53: "Any destruction by the Occupying Power of real or personal property belonging individually or collectively to private persons or to the State, or to other public authorities, or to social or cooperative organizations, is prohibited, except where such destruction is rendered absolutely necessary by military operations." (Shahak 1974, p. 183))

Collective punishment of Palestinians also can be traced back to British mandatory techniques in suppressing the 1936–1939 revolt (Note: "The instability caused by the revolt was augmented by increasingly brutal measures taken during the British counterinsurgency campaign: emergency regulations, military courts, collective punishment, the demolition of houses (and indeed entire neighbourhoods), looting, revenge killings, and the like." (Likhovski 2017, p. 75)) and has been reintroduced and in effect since the early days of the occupation, and was denounced by Israel Shahak as early as 1974. Notoriety for the practice arose in 1988 when, in response to the killing of a suspected collaborator in the village, Israeli forces shut down Qabatiya, arrested 400 of the 7,000 inhabitants, bulldozed the homes of people suspected of involvement, cut all of its telephone lines, banned the importation of any form of food into the village or the export of stone from its quarries to Jordan, shutting off all contact with the outside world for almost 5 weeks (24 February-3 April). In 2016 Amnesty International stated that the various measures taken in the commercial and cultural heart of Hebron over 20 years of collective punishment have made life so difficult for Palestinians (Note: When the Beit Hadassah settlement was established without Israeli government authority, a barbed wire fence to protect settlers was erected in front of the shops and all Palestinian shoppers had to be frisked before entering them (Playfair 1988, p. 410).) that thousands of businesses and residents have been forcibly displaced, enabling Jewish settlers to take over more properties.

=== House demolitions ===
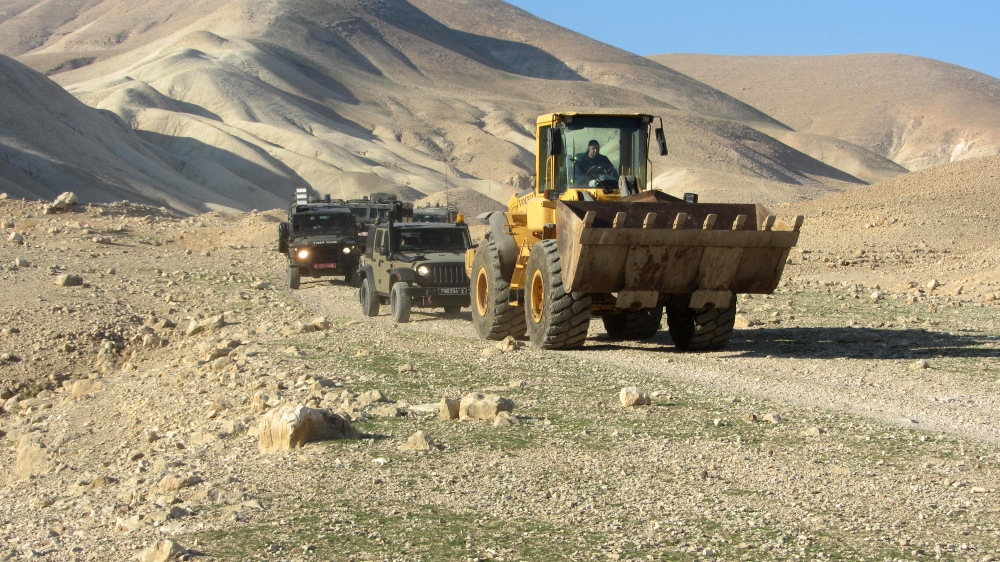
Israeli military forces arriving to demolish the Palestinian community of Khirbet Ein Karzaliyah on 8 January 2014, rendering homeless the entire population of 10 adults and 15 minors; the military returned a month later to demolish tents in which residents were living since the last demolition

House demolition is considered a form of collective punishment. According to the law of occupation, the destruction of property, save for reasons of absolute military necessity, is prohibited. The practice of demolishing Palestinian houses began within two days of the conquest of the area in the Old City of Jerusalem known as the Moroccan Quarter, adjacent to the Western Wall. From the outset of the occupation of the Palestinian territories down to 2015, according to an estimate by the ICAHD, it has been estimated that Israel has razed 48,488 Palestinian structures, with a concomitant displacement of hundreds of thousands of Palestinians.

Israel regards its practice as directed against houses built without Israeli permits or a form of deterrence of terrorism, since a militant is thereby forced to consider the effect of his actions on his family. Between September 2000 and the end of 2004, of the 4,100 homes the IDF razed in the territories, 628, housing 3,983 people were undertaken as punishment because a member of a family had been involved in the Al Aqsa insurgency. From 2006 until 31 August 2018, Israel demolished at least 1,360 Palestinian residential units in the West Bank (not including East Jerusalem), causing 6,115 people – including at least 3,094 minors – to lose their homes. 698 of these, homes to 2,948 Palestinians of whom 1,334 minors, were razed in the Jordan Valley (January 2006 – September 2017).

Even huts by shepherds, on which taxes have been duly paid, can be demolished. (Note: "An old man, Salim Id Al-Hathalin, grabs hold of me. He is waving papers – one a receipt from the tax authorities, confirming that he has paid taxes on the land he owns here in the village; the other a demolition order issued by the Civil Administration against his makeshift tent-cum-hut, which he points out to me as he cries: 'Why do they want to destroy my house? Where can I go? Can I go to America? I have nothing and they want to take that nothing from me. Can you help me? Where am I supposed to go?'" (Shulman 2018, p. 28))

=== Permit regime ===
From 1967, almost every aspect of ordinary everyday Palestinian life was subject to pervasive military regulations, calculated to number of 1,300 by 1996, from planting trees and importing books, to house extensions. Military order 101 denied West Bankers the right to purchase any form of printed matter – books, posters, photographs and even paintings – from abroad (including from Israel) unless prior authorization had been obtained from the military. In the first two decades Palestinians were required to apply for permits and licenses for an enormous number of things such as a driver's license, a telephone, trademark and birth registration, and a good conduct certificate to secure jobs in numerous professions. Obtaining such permits has been described as a via dolorosa. The precise criteria to be satisfied for obtaining permits have never been clarified. It has been likened to the pass system of Apartheid. Zygmunt Bauman's warnings of the debilitating effect bureaucracy may have on the human condition has been cited to throw light on the Orwellian or Kafkaesque trap of red tape that, it is argued, places a stranglehold on Palestinian autonomy. There are 42 types of permits, depending on the purpose of one's movements, required by Israeli authorities as of 2018.

=== Impact on education ===
The high priority traditionally accorded education in Palestinian society continued over the early occupation, with, by 1979, Palestinians making up an estimated 10% of all Arab university graduates. Internal evidence from leaked reports in the 1960s suggest that improved high education for Israeli Arabs was thought at the time to pose a potential security threat. (Note: Shin Bet chief Amos Manor warned that "educated Arabs could constitute a 'problem' and added, 'As long as they're half-educated, I'm not worried.'." (Raz 2021b)) Israel signed the International Covenant on Economic, Social and Cultural Rights in 1966, ratified in 1991. After 1967, Israel asserted that the right to education did not apply to the West Bank, East Jerusalem and Gaza, territories it held under occupation, since they lay outside Israel's sovereign borders.

During the first Intifada at one point Israel imposed a 19-month closure on all schools in the West Bank, including kindergartens, suggesting to at least one observer that Israel was intentionally aiming to disrupt the cognitive development of Palestinian youths. In the first two years of the Al-Aqsa Intifada, 100 schools were fired on by the IDF, some were bombed and others occupied as military outposts. In 2017, according to one estimate, Israel had issued either demolition or "stop work" orders affecting 55 West Bank schools.

=== Night raids ===
According to Major General Tal Russo, the IDF undertakes operations "all the time, every night, in all divisions." Israeli night raids are usually undertaken between 2 am and 4 am. The units, whose members are often masked and accompanied by dogs, arrive in full battle gear and secure entry by banging on doors or blowing them off their hinges. Surging blips in frequency may relate to rotation of new units into an area. Most occur in villages in close proximity to settlements. Such missions have several different purposes: to arrest suspects, conduct searches, map the internal structure of a dwelling, and photograph youths to improve recognition in future clashes. Laptops and cellphones are often seized, and, if returned, not infrequently damaged. Vandalism is commonplace, with looted objects given to needy soldiers or those on low pay, as in Operation Defensive Shield. Reports of stashes of money that go missing after a search are frequent. Many personal effects – photos of children or families, watches, medals, football trophies, books, Qur'ans, jewelry – are taken and stored away, and, according to one informant, intelligence officer trainees were allowed to take items of such Palestinian "memorabilia", called "booty," from storerooms. After international protests, in February 2014 a pilot scheme was begun to issue summonses instead of arresting children at night, and programmed to last until December 2015 The purpose of mapping raids is, reportedly, to work out how an area looks from Palestinian angles for future planning to enable an option for "straw widows" operations (mounting ambushes from inside those homes).

The practice by Israeli military units of raiding, making arrests in, and ransacking Palestinians homes deep in the night is a long-standing practice, persisting to the present day. In just three days over 21–23 January 2018, 41, 24 and 32 separate raids were made (Note: "Every week thousands of soldiers, flesh of our flesh, create these statistics, which our amnesia devours." (Hass 2018a)) In 2006 Israel made 6,666 raids inside the occupied territories. In the first six months of 2007, 3,144 Israeli search/arrest raids were made in the West Bank the parents of 90% of minors arrested, blindfolded and handcuffed in night raids, were given no explanation for the abduction, nor information about where the child would be detained. In another study, 72.7% of children studied had witnessed night raids, the traumatic experience coming second after watching scenes of mutilated or wounded bodies on TV. An extrapolation from this figure would, according to the NGO WCLAC, suggest that from the time martial law was imposed in June 1967 up to 2015, over 65,000 night raids had been conducted by the Israeli military on Palestinian homes in the West Bank (not including East Jerusalem).

=== Arrests and administrative detention ===
An estimated 650,000 Palestinians were detained by Israel from 1967 to 2005, one in three of all Palestinians in the first two decades alone; by 2023, the number had risen to one million. The military court system, regarded as the institutional centerpiece of the occupation, treats Palestinians as "foreign civilians" and is presided over by Jewish Israeli judges drew on prior British Mandatory law, where its application to Jewish activists was vigorously protested by the yishuv representatives. Four provisions entail (a) long detention of suspects incommunicado (b) without access to a lawyer (c) coercive interrogation to obtain evidence and (d) the use of "secret evidence". Over this period, tens of thousands have been subject to administrative detention, whose rationale is to incarcerate suspects who, in conventional criminal law, might not be convictable. Taisir al-Arouri, a Bir Zeit University professor of mathematics, was arrested at night on 21 April 1974 and released on 18 January 1978, after suffering 45 months of imprisonment without trial or charges being laid, only after Amnesty International issued a public protest.

The practice was considered by one scholar in 1978 as "an aberration of criminal justice" of a provisory nature. In 2017 Amnesty International, noted that "hundreds of Palestinians, including children, civil society leaders and NGO workers were regularly under administrative detention", and regards some, such as Khalida Jarrar and Ahmad Qatamesh, as prisoners of conscience. The United Nations Special Rapporteur on the occupied Palestinian territories described many convictions as resulting from "a litany of violations of international law, including due process violations, that taint the legitimacy of the administration of justice by the occupying power."

As of August 2023, 1,200 Palestinians were detained without charge or trial, in a practice referred to as "administrative detention"; Israel justifies the practice on the basis of security. The administrative detention of at least 105 Palestinians was based on an Israeli law known as the "unlawful combatants law", which excludes the detained from prisoner of war status under article four of the Third Geneva Convention. Amid a wave of mass arrests and detentions during the Gaza war, the number of administrative detainees rose to 2,873 as of 6 December 2023, an all-time high, according to HaMoked, an Israeli NGO. Conditions of detention have reportedly deteriorated drastically since 7 October 2023, with numerous allegations of mistreatment and torture from detainees, NGOs, and intergovernmental organizations.

=== Torture ===
States are obliged under the Fourth Geneva Convention to prevent torture, including mental suffering. According to Lisa Hajjar (2005) and Dr. Rachel Stroumsa, the director of the Public Committee Against Torture in Israel, torture has been an abiding characteristic of Israeli methods of interrogation of Palestinians. Torture can be of two types, physical and psychological. Reports of torture emerged in the 1970s, and began to be documented in detail by the NGO Al-Haq in the mid-1980s. The 1987 the Landau Commission examined some abuses and concluded "moderate physical pressure" was acceptable. The practice was then banned by Israel's High Court, barring case-by-case authorizations by the Attorney-General.

The Hebrew army slang term tertur is associated with policies introduced by Rafael Eitan, who ordered army troops and border police to engage in repeated arrests and the humiliation of large numbers of the Palestinian population in the territories. This refers to practices such as the wholesale roundups that took place whenever West Bank Arabs staged nationalist demonstrations. Israeli border police have been witnessed forcing Arabs to sing the Israeli national anthem, slap each other's faces and crawl and bark like dogs. The police have also arrested thousands of Arabs each year on "security" charges, which have ranged from outright terrorism to simply reading blacklisted books.

=== Children ===
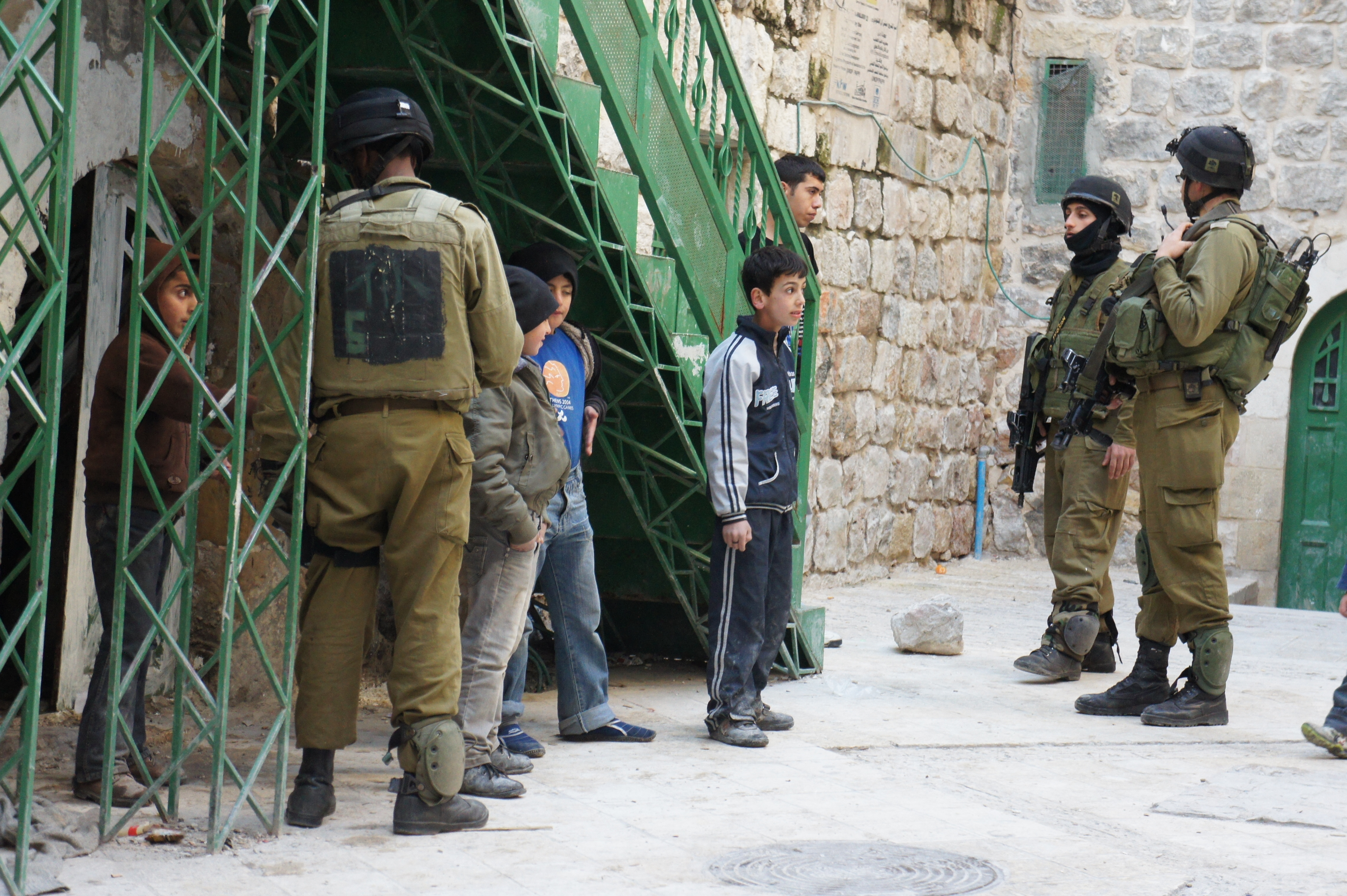
Children detained by Golani Brigade soldiers in Hebron

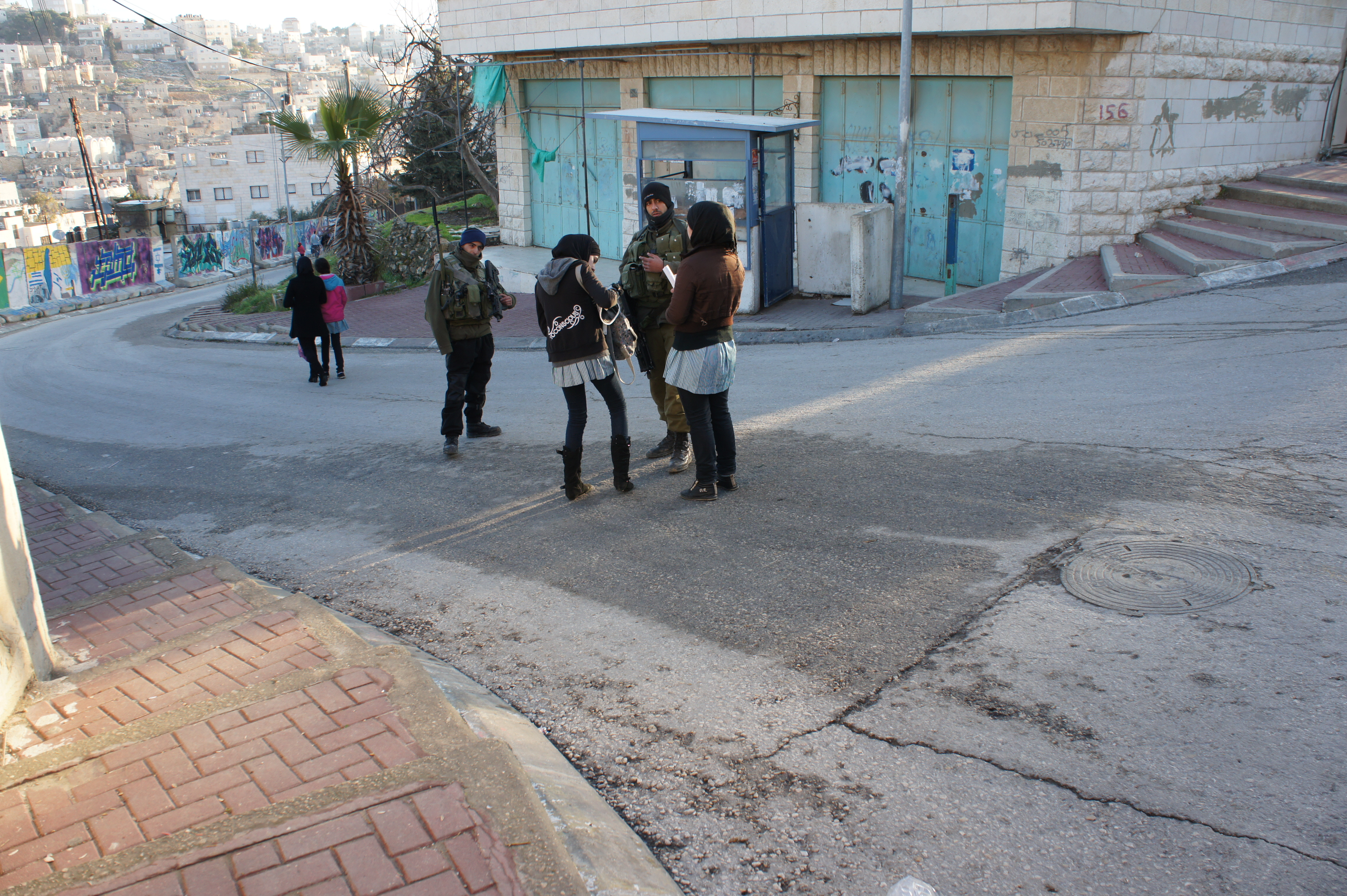
Palestinian girls having their school bags searched by Israeli soldiers in Tel Rumeida, Hebron

Documented incidents of Israeli forces targeting and killing Palestinian children date back to the earliest days of the conflict. Following the 1948 war, before Israel's formal occupation of the West Bank, border skirmishes between Israelis and Arabs were a regular occurrence with multiple cases involving Israeli soldiers shooting unarmed Palestinians, including children, dead. During the 1952 Beit Jala raid, 4 children ranging in age from 6 to 14 were killed by machine gun fire. During the First Intifada, Palestinian children regularly suffered serious, often fatal injuries. The First Intifada saw exceptionally high involvement by Palestinian teenagers, prompting Israel to declare stone throwing a felony under occupation law, a categorization that applied to children as well as adults and allowed for protracted incarceration of minors. Ill-treatment of Palestinian children in the Israeli military detention system appears to be widespread, systematic, and institutionalized. According to a 2013 study by the United Nations International Children's Emergency Fund, covering 10 years of allegations of the mistreatment of children in Israel's military practices in the West Bank, though international law requires that all children in contact with judicial systems be treated with dignity and respect at all times, the evidence from multiple outside observers over a decade suggests Palestinian children under Israel military detention suffer cruel and degrading treatment. In law, the prohibition against such practices is "absolute and unconditional," and even security considerations or threats of war cannot override the rule.

Children constitute half of the Palestinian population, and though often construed as "mute victims or misguided puppets", they actively engage in the resistance, with some arguing that in doing so they forfeit their rights. (Note: "Though both Palestinian and Israeli children are victims of the conflict, Israeli Jewish children are seen as proper innocent victims of terrorism in contrast to Palestinian children who are often perceived as dangerous props of irresponsible parents, a conniving Palestinian Authority and desperate militant groups." (Sait 2004, pp. 211–212, 215)) According to James Graff, Palestinian children comprise a notable segment of Palestinians targeted, and can be included in categories from which they are normally exempted, and be singled out as a group to be subject to traumatizing violence, and targeted in random shootings, gassings and violence by soldiers and by settlers sponsored by the state.

According to the Swedish branch of Save the Children, between 23,600 and 29,900 children required medical treatment after suffering injuries from IDF beatings during the first two years of the First Intifada, a third of them aged 10 or under. Under Yitzhak Rabin's 19 January 1988 order to employ "might, power and beatings" and an interview in which he spoke of the need to "break their bones", (Note: Zeev Schiff, an Israeli military correspondent at the time, wrote: "The extent of the injuries caused by the new policy was harrowing. Considering that whole corps of soldiers were engaged in battering away at defenseless citizens, it is hardly surprising that thousands of Palestinians – many of them innocent of any wrong-doing – were badly injured, some to the point of being handicapped. There were countless instances in which young Arabs were dragged behind walls or deserted buildings and systematically beaten all but senseless. The clubs descended on limbs, joints, and ribs until they could be heard to crack- especially as Rabin let slip a 'break their bones' remark in a television interview which many soldiers took as a recommendation, if not exactly an order." (Gordon 2008, p. 157)) beatings, which until then had usually been a hidden interrogation method, went public, until an outcry arose when journalists filmed the tactic, a scandal countered by issuing a ban on media entering the territories in the spring of 1988.

Minors (16 years old and under) adding up to 5% of the child population constituted 35–40% of the 130,000 Palestinians who suffered serious injuries from Israeli troops in this uprising. (Note: For the first 3 years, from December 1987 to December 1990, the figure is 106,660 (Peteet 1994, p. 35).) Of 15-year-olds and under requiring medical treatment, 35% were injured by Israeli gunfire, 50% by beatings, and 14.5% suffered from tear gassing. From 2009 to 2018 Israel Security squads shot dead 93 Palestinian minors in West Bank clashes. In the period of the Al-Aqsa uprising, the ratios of those killed indicate that roughly 20- 25% were children on both sides, with the difference that Israeli fatalities were from incidents of body-bombing in which they were not the primary targets, whereas a substantial proportion of Palestinian children were killed by Israeli sniper gun-fire directed individually, according to Frank Afflitto. From September 2000-to December 2003, 109 children were killed by "one-shot wonders" in the head, 4 in the neck, and 56 by exclusive heart-chest shots. A further 90 were killed with two or three gunshot wounds. Overall, in the 3.25 years after the second uprising 427 children were shot dead by IDF forces and settlers.

In June 2026, a 94-page report by the UN Independent International Commission of Inquiry on the Occupied Palestinian Territory found that between October 2023 and October 2025, the conflict resulted in the deaths of at least 20,179 Palestinian children and injuries to 44,143 others, representing approximately 30% of the overall death toll, a significantly higher proportion of child fatalities than in previous Gaza conflicts. Backed by forensic pathology analysis of CT scans and medical reports, the commission concluded there were reasonable grounds to determine that Israeli forces directly targeted children using snipers and quadcopter drones. The report highlighted specific cases, such as a 14-year-old boy left to bleed to death by a military patrol when no active fighting was occurring, and documented a widespread pattern of Israeli soldiers filming themselves mocking, weaponizing, and desecrating symbols of childhood across at least 35 instances in private homes and public spaces, which it assessed demonstrated a prevailing dehumanizing attitude enabled by a tacit acceptance among military commanders. The commission asserted that these actions continued past the October 2025 ceasefire and served as a key element establishing genocidal intent to destroy the Palestinian group in Gaza by weakening its capacity to exist, causing irreversible physical and long-term psychological harm, and producing an intergenerational "occupied psyche". The report also found that Israel's targeting of neonatal and maternity care centers directly impacted the survival of newborns, resulting in increased miscarriages and birth defects, while severe blockades caused fatal malnutrition. In the West Bank and East Jerusalem, the report documented a sharp increase in settler violence against children and found systematic mistreatment, food deprivation, and sexual violence against detained Palestinian boys, concluding that the treatment constituted the crimes against humanity of torture and other inhumane acts. The commission noted it had identified specific military units within the Israeli security forces responsible for these actions to ensure future legal accountability.

== Resources ==
=== Agriculture ===
The pastoral economy was a fundamental wing of the Palestinian economy. Of the 2,180 square kilometres (840 mi^{2}) of grazing land in the West Bank Israel permitted in the first years of the 21st century only 225 square kilometres (87 mi^{2}) for such use. In certain areas, such as the South Hebron Hills, Palestinian bedouin shepherds have their grazing lands disseminated with poison pellets that kill off their flocks, and require minute gleaning and disposal to restore the land to health. In Area C, nearly 500,000 dunams of arable land exist, Palestinian access to which is severely restricted while 137,000 are cultivated or occupied by Israeli settlements. Were the 326,400 dunams theoretically open to Palestinian use made available, the World Bank calculates, it would add $US 1,068 billion to Palestinian productive capacities. Another 1,000,000 dunams could be exploited for grazing or forestry, were Israel to lift its restrictions. The World Bank estimates that were Palestinian agriculture given access to better water resources, they would benefit by a boost in agricultural output of around $1 billion per annum.

After 1967, restrictions were placed on the types of fruit tree and vegetables that could be planted, and even the importation of tractors required an Israeli permit. Just after the occupation, a trial study carried out on Deir Dibwan's land, which is rich in underground water, concluded that it showed great promise as one of the best sites in the West Bank for growing oranges and bananas. An Israeli drilling permit could not be obtained, leading most of those involved in the project to emigrate to the U.S. Israel's control of land, water, trade and markets, and its specification and rigorous restrictions on what could be grown, is held responsible for the decline of agriculture as a share of West Bank GDP, and the drop of agricultural labourers in the work market from 46% to 27%, so that from 1993 to 1995 output declined by 40.12%. In the years directly preceding the Al Aqsa uprising (1998–1999) the IDF and settlers uprooted 21,705 trees throughout the West Bank and Gaza Strip. From 2000 to 2009, ARIJ estimated that 1,628,126 fruit trees in the West Bank and Gaza were destroyed or uprooted by Israel.

Destruction of agricultural goods was considerable during the second intifada. In the five months following its outbreak, 57,928 olive trees, 49,370 citrus trees, 22,270 stone-fruit trees, 11,514 date palms, 12,000 banana trees and 30,282 grapevines were uprooted. Olive oil production dropped 80% that year as a result. In the 15-month period from the outbreak, down to December 2001, the total damage was calculated as 155,343 olive trees, 150,356 citrus trees, 54,223 almond trees, 12,505 date palm trees, 39,227 grape vines, 18,400 banana trees, and 49,851 other varieties of tree. From September 2000 to December 2002, Israeli forces destroyed 14,196 forest trees. In the first two years, taking in the damage wrought by Israel in both the West Bank and the Gaza Strip, according to Cheryl Rubenberg, 667,000 trees were eradicated and 3,669,000 square metres of agricultural land destroyed. According to Palestinian authorities, the restrictive allocation of water to Palestinian agriculture has remained constant, at 84 million cubic metres per annum, since 1967. The Oslo Accords foresaw a supplementary 70–80 million cubic metres being supplied, but in two decades only about half of this additional supply had been provided.

The olive tree, aside from its economic function, is a symbol of Palestinian nationhood, of their quest for independence, much as the pine introduced by Zionist arboriculture. 15% of the territories – 45% of its arable land – is covered by olive groves, and is both a key resource, and its bimonthly autumnal harvesting a period of deep socioeconomic importance for families in most villages in the West Bank, for whom it provides roughly 40% (2009) of West Bank agricultural output. It has mopped up unemployment caused by job loss in Israel after the outbreak of the Second Intifada and the olive is known colloquially as shajara el-fakir (the pauper's tree), and regarded as holy (shajara mubaraka). (Note: "the Qur’an regards the olive tree as one of two trees blessed by Allah (the other is the fig)." (Braverman 2009, pp. 240–242)) Their uprooting by state agencies or settlers is an everyday occurrence in the West Bank.

Israeli officials see olive grove cultivation as "one of the best ownership techniques around". (Note: 1967. The legal norm that has had the most effect on the shaping of tree struggles in the West Bank is Article 78 of the Ottoman Land Code (1274 to the Hijra, the Muslim calendar). Put simply, Article 78 grants a long-term cultivator the right of adverse possession... Article 78 of the 1858 Ottoman Land Code states that "every one who has possessed and cultivated Miri land for ten years without dispute acquires a right by prescription [...], and he shall be given a new title deed gratuitously." (Braverman 2008, pp. 451, 455)) One Israeli official likened Palestinian olive trees to Palestinian children. They look naïve but several years down the track they turn into ticking bombs. (Note: "Like children, their trees look so naïve, as they cannot harm anyone- But like (their) children, several years later they turn into a ticking bomb." (Braverman 2009, p. 237)) The centrality of such olive groves for Palestinians is, according to Michael Sfard, viewed in the Zionist narrative as emblematic of "Arab laziness", since it grows alone and can be shaken down once a year to yield its wealth. (Note: In rabbinical tradition, felling olive trees is forbidden. The Beit El settlement's rabbi Zalman Melamed permits of only one exception, i.e. when they are known to serve as terrorist hideouts (Braverman 2009, p. 252).) In one analysis in 2006 it emerged that only 4% of complaints against settler trespass and destruction of Palestinian olive trees ever led to prosecution.

Following an Ottoman practice of uprooting olive trees to punish tax evasion, Israel began destroying groves, but with the expressed purpose of increasing security for settlements, and visibility for its internal West Bank road system servicing the colonial infrastructure. Construction of the Separation Barrier, erected predominantly on West Bank land, led to the uprooting of tens of thousands of olive trees. In just one village, Qafeen, the wall's route led to the uprooting of 12,000 trees of this variety, while alienating the inhabitants from their groves with a further 100,000 trees left on the Israeli side in a seam-zone, which they may access only once a year. (Note: Following scandals suggesting many of these removed trees were being sold underhand in Israel, with a 600-year-old olive tree earning a market price of $8,000, the IDF undertook to offer to replant them if the Palestinian owner could find other land for them (Braverman 2009, p. 247).) Aside from state practices, settlers have waged what one scholar terms "tree warfare" consisting in the stealing, uprooting, chopping or burning of native Palestinian olive groves, often as part of price tag operations. Of the 708,000 dunums of irrigable land in the West Bank only 247,000 dunums under aggregate irrigation, and it has been calculated (2009) the gross margin Palestinians forego touches close to $480 million per annum, roughly about 10% of GDP. The collateral effect of loss for potential employment runs close to (upper estimate) 10,000 jobs. The World Bank has observed that only 35 per cent of irrigable Palestinian land is actually irrigated, which costs the economy 110,000 jobs and 10 per cent of GDP.

=== Water ===
In the wake of 1967, Israel abrogated Palestinian water rights in the West Bank, and with Military Order 92 of August of that year invested all power over water management to the military authority, Military order 158 of November of that year required Palestinians to obtain a permit from the military authorities before developing any new water installation. As of 1996, no Palestinian had received a permit to drill a well since that date, by which time Israel drew a third of its fresh water and 50% of its drinking water, from the West Bank. According to Human Rights Watch Israel's confiscation of water violates the Hague Regulations of 1907, which prohibit an occupying power from expropriating the resources of occupied territory for its own benefit.

Palestinians have complained that their economy and agriculture are badly affected by the depletion of village waters in favour of supplying settlements. Israel placed restrictive policies on West Bank users. Differentials in costs of supply to Palestinians and settlements, which consumed 8 to 10 times what Palestinians were allowed, was blatant: settlements paid 0.5 New Israeli shekels (NIS), while Palestinian villages paid 1.8 NIS, per m3, with the former supplied daily, while delivery to the latter was limited to one or two days a week. "Blatant discrimination" exists in water pricing, allocation and delivery systems. Water consumption by Israeli settlers in the Territories is roughly eight to ten times that of Palestinians. Water is sold to Israeli settlements for 0.5 New Israeli shekels (NIS) per m3, while it was sold to Palestinian villages for 1.8 NIS per m3.

According to John Cooley, West Bank Palestinian farmers' wells were a key element behind Israel's post-1967 strategy to keep the area and in order to protect "Jewish water supplies" from what was considered "encroachment" (Note: "Keeping Tel Aviv, Haifa, and the other cities of the Israeli coastal plain from running dry depends on blocking Arab water development in the West Bank that could stop the aquifers flow westward: hence the ban on Arab wells." (Cooley 1984, p. 17))

By 2013, though some villages had only 15 litres per person, it was estimated West Bank Palestinians were supplied an average per capita 70 litres per day, as opposed to the 280–300 litres per person for Jewish settlers. Sometimes the contrast is starker: Al-Hadidiya's 20 litres per person versus the 431 litres per day consumed on the neighbouring Jewish moshav settlement of Ro'i, which draws 431 litres per person per day from a well it drilled on Al-Hadidiya land.

Israeli settlements have also pursued a practice of taking over for their own uses numerous springs belonging to Palestinian villages, appropriating them to create adjoining parks suitable to tourism. Palestinians are denied access.

=== Waste zone ===
Israel ratified the international Basel Convention treaty on Israel on 14 December 1994, according to which, any transfer of waste must be performed with an awareness of the dangers posed to the disempowered occupied people. It forbids the creation of "environmental sacrifice zones" in their midst. Israel, it is argued, has used the West Bank as a "sacrifice" zone by placing 15 waste treatment plants there under less stringent rules than those required in the Israeli legal system, thereby exposing the local people and environment to hazardous materials. The military authorities do not render public the details of these operations. These materials consist of such things as sewage sludge, infectious medical waste, used oils, solvents, metals, electronic waste and batteries.

Within Israel strict environment laws apply. Of 121 settlements studied in 2007, 81 had wastewater facilities, many subject to breakdown, with sewage flowing into streams affecting Palestinian villages nearby. Few pollution indictments result in action. Israel built four plants for Palestinian waste in the 1970s, of which only one was functioning in 2007, with Israeli budgetary problems being cited for the lack of adequate infrastructure leaving most Palestinian sewage untreated. The landfill near Al-Jiftlik in the Jericho Governorate, built on absentee Palestinian property without planning or an environmental impact analysis, is for the exclusive use 1,000 tons per day of waste produced by Israeli settlements and cities within Israel. Palestinians are restricted to three landfills, and permits for more have been denied unless the sites can be used to dump settlement garbage. Even if a permit is given without this agreement, settler waste is still dumped there under military escort.

=== Resource extraction ===
According to the Hague Conventions (Article 55) an occupying power may reap some value from the resources of the country occupied but not deplete its assets: the usufruct must benefit the people under occupation. The Oslo Accords agreed to the transfer of mining rights to the Palestinian Authority.

Israel has given concessions for 11 settlement quarries to operate. The World Bank estimates that 275 quarries could be opened in Area C, and that Israeli restrictions cost the Palestinian economy US$241 million per year. Palestinians are also denied permits to process Dead Sea minerals, such as bromine, about 75% of world production of which comes from this area, while Israeli firms such as Ahava do so and export to the EU. The latter restrictions are estimated to cost the Palestinian economy $642 million.

== Economic and social benefits and costs of the occupation ==
Many Israeli businesses operate in the West Bank, often run by settlers who enjoy the benefits of government subsidies, low rents, favourable tax rates and access to cheap Palestinian labour. Human Rights Watch claims that the "physical imprint", with 20 Israeli industrial zones covering by 2016 some 1,365 hectares, of such commercial operations, agricultural and otherwise, is more extensive than that of the settlements themselves. The restrictions on Palestinian enterprise in Area C cause unemployment which is then mopped up by industrial parks that can draw on a pool of people without job prospects if not in settlements. Some Palestinian workers at the Barkan Industrial Park have complained anonymously that they were paid less than the minimum Israeli wage per hour ($5.75), with payments ranging from $1.50 to 2–4 dollars, with shifts of up to 12 hours, no vacations, sick days, pay slips or social benefits. Many such businesses export abroad, making the world complicit in the settlement project.

Israeli policy aimed to impede any form of Palestinian competition with Israeli economic interests. The approach was set forth by Israel's then Defense Minister Yitzhak Rabin in 1986, who stated:

"there will be no development initiated by the Israeli Government, and no permits will be given for expanding agriculture or industry, which may compete with the State of Israel".

The World Bank estimated that the annual economic costs to the Palestinian economy of the Israeli occupation of Area C alone in 2015 was 23% of GNP in direct costs, and 12% in indirect costs, totally 35% which, together with fiscal loss of revenue at 800 million dollars, totals an estimated 5.2 billion dollars. Fiscally, one estimate places the "leakage" of Palestinian revenue back to the Israeli treasury at 17% of total Palestinian public revenue, 3.6% of GNP. A 2015 estimate put annual Israeli government expenditure on settlements at $US1.1 billion, though this is an inference given that the government does not report its settlement outlays. By 1982 subsidized Israeli agricultural productions and unhampered flow of Israeli manufactures hindered the growth of manufacturing industries in the Palestinian territories. High tariffs imposed by Israel on imports from countries outside the area of Israel meant Palestinian consumers had a choice of paying high prices for imported goods from foreign countries, or purchasing them from high-cost Israeli suppliers. Palestinian goods exporting to Israel were hit by tariffs, which down to 1991 earned Israel annually $1,000,000, but Israeli exports to the Palestinian territories were exempted from import duties. Since internal economic growth is hampered by Israeli restrictions, and, to compensate, 40% of the Palestinian economy relies on international aid, it is argued that such aid constitutes a subsidy to the occupation itself, making it "one of the cheapest occupations", for Israel. (Note: "These economic costs are partially paid by the international community's funds which are creating one of the cheapest occupations and relieve Israel from its duties and responsibilities as an Occupying Power." (Beckouche 2017, pp. 154–155, 154)) The Paris Protocol undersigned in 1994 allowed Israel to collect VAT on all Palestinian imports and good from that country or in transit through its ports, with the system of clearance revenue giving it effective control over roughly 75% of PA income. Israel can withhold that revenue as a punitive measure, as it did in response to the decision by the PA to adhere to the International Criminal Court in 2015.

A 2009 World Bank study concluded that "Very few economies have faced such a comprehensive array of obstacles to investment – not just of physical impediments to movement, but also comprehensive institutional and administrative barriers to economies of scale and natural resources, along with an unclear political horizon and the inability to predictably plan movement of people and goods".

=== Overall economic costs ===
A joint study by the Palestinian Ministry of National Economy and researchers at the Applied Research Institute–Jerusalem argued that by 2010 the costs of occupation amounted in 2010 alone rose to 84.9% of the total Palestinian GDP ($US 6.897 billion). Their estimate for 2014 states that the total economic cost of Israel's occupation amounted to 74.27% of Palestinian nominal GDP, or some $(US) 9.46 billion. The cost to Israel's economy by 2007 was estimated at $50 billion.

=== Indirect costs to Israel ===
The indirect cost to the Israeli economy for defense outlays and maintaining operations in the territories has also been substantial. One analysis has concluded that the costs of maintaining Israel's occupation is a contributing factor to the rise of poverty in Israel, where poverty levels have jumped from one in ten families in the 1970s, compared to one in five at present. The high costs of subsidizing the settlement project shifted investment from Israel's development towns on its periphery and led to cutbacks in sectors like health care, education and welfare. (Note: Dr Ruby Nathanzon of the Macro Center for Political Economy: "Imagine how much less poverty there could have been in Israel.. There's a terrible distortion, an enormous economic cost in addition to the huge military burden." (Shauli 2007)) The settlement surge under Begin's Likud government was detrimental to housing development for Israelis in Israel: 44% of the entire budget of the Ministry of Housing and Construction in 1982 went to West Bank settlements. The substitution of imported foreign labour for Palestinians has also arguably lowered the bargaining power of Israeli blue-collar workers. In the aftermath of the Second Intifada, the budgetary allocations for Israel's social security net were reduced drastically: between 2001 and 2005 as defense outlays ratcheted up, child allowances were cut by 45%, unemployment compensation by 47%, and income maintenance by 25%. The annual growth, NIS 4.6 billion, in the defence budget for the decade 2007 onwards recommended by the Brodet Commission was close to Israel's total annual expenditure on higher education. Defense specialists also claim that guarding settlers lowers the combat readiness of soldiers, since they have far less time to train. It is also argued that the logic of settlements undermines Israel's rule of law. (Note: "the settlements systematically undermine Israel's rule of law. The project of settling the West Bank was based on flaunting Israeli law from the outset (the Passover feast held to stake a claim in Hebron, the settling of Sebastia, and later the proliferation of outposts that are illegal even under Israeli law). Forging documents, deceiving authorities, flagrantly breaching the law – all these are what made the massive land grab possible, along with the covert mechanisms for channelling taxpayer funds into the settlements far from the public eye." (Gordis & Levi 2017, p. 24))

=== Indirect economic gain to Israel ===
The high-tech security and urban warfare systems, and the surveillance devices developed while securing the occupation particularly during the Al-Aqsa Intifada, have turned Israel into one of the major exporters of such systems in the world. Israel has become a pioneering leader in the manufacture of drones, border surveillance sensors, with the commercial advantage of having these devices "battle-tested" in the "laboratories" of the occupied territory.

=== Integration of East Jerusalem ===
Arab residents of East Jerusalem are increasingly becoming integrated into Israeli society, in terms of education, citizenship, national service and in other aspects. Trends among East Jerusalem residents have shown: increasing numbers of applications for an Israeli ID card; more high school students taking the Israeli matriculation exams; greater numbers enrolling in Israeli academic institutions; a decline in the birthrate; more requests for building permits; a rising number of East Jerusalem youth volunteering for national service; a higher level of satisfaction according to polls of residents and increased Israeli health services. According to David Pollock, a senior fellow at The Washington Institute for Near East Policy, in the hypothesis that a final agreement was reached between Israel and the Palestinians with the establishment of a two-state solution, 48% of East Jerusalem Arabs would prefer being citizens of Israel, while 42% of them would prefer the State of Palestine and 9% would prefer Jordanian citizenship.

=== Communications ===
Under the Oslo Accords, Israel agreed that the Palestinian territories had a right to construct and operate an independent communications network. In 2016 a World Bank analysis concluded the provisions of this agreement had not been applied, causing notable detrimental effects to Palestinian development. It took 8 years for Israel to agree to a request for frequencies for 3G services, though they were limited, causing a bottleneck which left Israeli competitors with a distinct market advantage. The local Wataniya mobile operator's competitiveness suffered from Israeli restrictions and delays, and illegal Israeli operators in the West Bank, with 4G services available by that date, still maintained an unfair advantage over Palestinian companies. Israel imposes three other constraints that hamper Palestinian competitiveness: restrictions are imposed on imports of equipment for telecom and ICT companies, and movement to improve the development and maintenance of infrastructure in Area C, and finally, Palestinian telecommunications accessing international links must go through companies with Israeli registration. From 2008 to 2016, they concluded, progress in negotiating resolutions to these problems had been "very slim".

=== Tourism ===
The West Bank is a key attraction for pilgrims and tourists and has a rich heritage of deep significance for members of the Abrahamic religions. After 1967 the loss of East Jerusalem cut off potential gains to the West Bank economy from tourism. From 92 to 94 cents in every dollar of the tourist trade goes to Israel, which exercises a virtual monopoly. Israel controls all access points to the major tourist attractions in East Jerusalem, Bethlehem and Jericho, and Palestinian hotels in most West Bank areas remain half-empty.

Israeli obstacles make Palestinian recreational access to, or development of tourist infrastructure around, the Dead Sea difficult. The World Bank estimates that $126 million annually and 2,900 jobs would accrue to the local economy if Palestinians were allowed to operate on similar terms available to Israel entrepreneurs. Palestinians have been blocked at checkpoints from beaches there putatively because their presence would harm Israeli tourist businesses.

=== Cultural impact ===
Many studies, following the work of Daniel Bar-Tal and Gavriel Salomon, have analyzed the emergence and consolidation of an "ethos of conflict", one of what they see as three key components of Israeli Jewish society – the others being collective memory of the conflict and collective emotional orientations – which have developed to cope with the stress of an intractable conflict. This complex can be broken down into eight societal values informing a unilateral outlook: (a) The justice of Israel's cause; (b) Security (including national survival) (c) Positive collective ethnocentric in-group images; (d) One's Own Victimization; (e) Delegitimizing the adversary by denying their humanity, allowing one to harm them; (f) Patriotism; (g) Beliefs reinforcing social solidarity, by ignoring internal disagreements; (h) Belief that peace is the goal. Recent research suggests that four of these – the persistence of a sense of historic trauma and an ethos of conflict (delegitimization of the opponent, security, own victimization and justness of one's own goals) – consistently influence decision-making on the conflict in the Israeli Supreme Court itself. The same model has been applied to Palestinian society, emphasizing that of all themes patriotism in the form of mūqāwama (resistance and readiness for self-sacrifice) form the keynote of Palestinian identity.

=== Loss of cultural property ===
The Israeli Antiquities Law of 1978 foresaw expropriations of any site necessary for preservation, excavation or research. The military administration can confiscate Palestinian land on or near such sites, deny their owners' building permits while at times, such areas are open to Israeli settlement. Under the Hague Convention of 1954 an occupying power may not remove material from the occupied country. In 2019 the Israeli High Court ruled that Israeli archaeological work in the West Bank may be kept off the public record. In 2019 alone, Israel made 119 demolition orders and warnings to desist from "destroying antiquities" in the West Bank, a rise of 162% over preceding years. Regavim's Shomrim Al Hanetzach ("guarding eternity") lobbies for such orders against what they call a "quiet Isis", though many affected families and villagers are unaware of any archaeological material on their land, and these zones encompass areas far larger than the actual known archaeological remains at their centre.

Albert Glock, among others, argued that the thrust of archaeology has been to interpret the Palestinian past in Christian and Jewish Zionist terms, in the latter instance, providing a charter for the occupation, to the detriment of the Palestinian cultural heritage. Many sites with dual cultural value have been wrested from Palestinian control, such as the Herodium, Joseph's Tomb in Nablus, the Cave of the Patriarchs in Hebron, Rachel's Tomb the Tomb of Jesse and Ruth in Tel Rumeida, Hebron and at Qumran near the Palestinian village of Shuqba there is a garbage dump for settlement waste. Many Palestinian heritage sites within the West Bank have been added to the Jewish heritage list. Aside from the destruction of villages, in Jerusalem and elsewhere, significant losses were incurred by the expropriation of libraries with extensive historical resources regarding Palestine's Arabic past.

== Sexual abuse of Palestinians by IDF soldiers ==
During the Gaza war, Palestinian women and girls in Gaza were subjected to severe wartime sexual violence. Reports indicate that they were randomly executed, often alongside their children, by the IDF. Even when holding white pieces of cloth as a sign of surrender, they were deliberately targeted and extrajudicially executed. Inhumane and degrading treatment included denial of basic necessities like menstruation pads, food, and medicine, as well as severe beatings, rape, and other forms of sexual violence. They were also subjected to stripping and searching by male Israeli army officers. The Office of the United Nations High Commissioner for Human Rights (OHCHR) reported that female detainees were photographed in "degrading circumstances" by Israeli troops, with these images subsequently being uploaded online.

On 19 February 2024, a group of United Nations special rapporteurs released a report stating, "Palestinian women and girls in detention have also been subjected to multiple forms of sexual assault, such as being stripped naked and searched by male Israeli army officers. At least two female Palestinian detainees were reportedly raped". One of the special rapporteurs, Reem Alsalem, cautioned that the reservation in reporting sexual violence was common due to reprisal concerns. Alsalem stated that since the 7 October attacks, women and girls in Israeli detention had faced an increasingly permissive attitude by Israeli officials towards sexual assault.

The special rapporteurs have also raised concerns over a number of Palestinian women and children going missing, with reports of children being separated from their parents. In one instance a female infant was reportedly forcibly relocated from her parents into Israel. In response to the report, a spokesman for the U.S. Department of State said, "Civilians and detainees must be treated humanely, and in accordance with international humanitarian law." Physicians for Human Rights-Israel also described the sexual humiliation of detainees, including sexual insults and urination on prisoners. The Palestinian Prisoner's Society stated men had been subjected to severe sexual assault, including attempted rape and violating strip searches.

Video evidence surfaced of what was described as a "flagrant violation of international laws related to the protection of civilians" by Euro-Mediterranean Human Rights Monitor. Israeli soldiers were shown surrounding detainees in Yatta, Hebron who were being dragged and assaulted by the Israeli soldiers. Many of the detainees had been stripped naked, having both their arms and feet bound, and beaten with the butts of rifles and trampled. Video evidence depicting degradation towards detainees shows Israeli soldiers transporting Palestinians from Ofer prison, all of whom are blindfolded and stripped completely naked. In another video uploaded by an Israeli soldier, a blindfolded and bound Palestinian is shown kneeling on the ground. The soldier taunts him in Arabic, telling him "صباح الخير يا قحبة" (Good morning, whore) before repeatedly kicking and spitting on him. On 11 December, Human Rights Watch director, Omar Shakir, stated the blindfolding and stripping of Palestinian detainees represented a war crime.

On August 26, 2024, a Human Rights Watch report highlighted the testimony of Walid Khalili, a paramedic and ambulance driver with the Palestinian Medical Relief Society. After being held in Sde Teiman for 20 days without charge, Khalili was transferred to a detention facility he identified as "al-Naqab" prison. During the transfer, he was cuffed, blindfolded, and threatened with rape by IDF soldiers. At al-Naqab, Khalili encountered other sick and wounded detainees, including a man who was visibly "bleeding from his bottom." The man confided to Khalili that, prior to his detention, "three soldiers took turns raping him with an M16 [assault rifle]. No one else knew, but he told me as a paramedic. He was terrified. His mental health was awful, he started talking to himself."

== See also ==
- Animal stereotypes of Palestinians in Israeli discourse
- Sexual and gender-based violence against Palestinians during the Gaza war
- Targeted killing by Israel
- Far-right politics in Israel
- Human rights in Israel
- Criticism of Israel
- Israeli war crimes
- Indiscriminate attack
- Human rights violations by the CIA
- Violence against Palestinian journalists
- Permanent United Nations Fact Finding Mission on the Israel Palestine conflict
- Israel and apartheid
- 2009 Aftonbladet Israel controversy
- Palestinian genocide accusation
- Gaza mass graves
- New antisemitism
- War and genocide

== Sources ==
- "A2. European Union, Internal Report on "Area C and Palestinian State Building," Brussels, January 2012 (excerpts)". Journal of Palestine Studies. 41 (3): 220–223. Spring 2012. doi:10.1525/jps.2012.xli.3.220. JSTOR 10.1525/jps.2012.xli.3.220.
- Abdulhadi, Rami S. (Summer 1990). "Land Use Planning in the Occupied Palestinian Territories". Journal of Palestine Studies. 19 (4): 46–63. doi:10.2307/2537388. JSTOR 2537388. S2CID 154217234.
- Abdullah, Daud (28 August 2017). "Education is a right being denied to Palestinian children, and Israel is the culprit". MEMO. Archived from the original on 24 September 2019.
- Abowd, Thomas Philip (2000). "The Moroccan Quarter: A History of the Present". Jerusalem Quarterly (7). Institute for Palestine Studies: 6–16. doi:10.70190/jq.I7.p6.
- Adam, Heribert; Moodley, Kogila (2005). Seeking Mandela: Peacemaking Between Israelis and Palestinians. Temple University Press. ISBN 978-1-59213-399-4. Archived from the original on 15 May 2023.
- "Advisory proceedings: pending cases". International Court of Justice. Archived from the original on 22 September 2023.
- Afflitto, Frank M. (2007). "Of Guns, Children, and the Maelstrom: Determining Purposive Action in Israeli-Perpetrated Firearm Deaths of Palestinian Chuildren and Minors". In Springwood, Charles Fruehling (ed.). Open Fire: Understanding Global Gun Cultures. Berg Publishers. pp. 42–54. ISBN 978-1-845-20417-4.
- Aharony, Michal (15 November 2018). "Is It Possible to Recover From Torture? Lessons From Holocaust Survivor and Philosopher Jean Améry". Haaretz. Archived from the original on 8 March 2020.
- Ahronheim, Anna (2 October 2017). "Israel to impose 11-day closure of West Bank and Gaza for Sukkot holiday". The Jerusalem Post. Archived from the original on 21 January 2020.
- Ajluni, Salem (Spring 2003). "The Palestinian Economy and the Second Intifada". Journal of Palestine Studies. 32 (3): 64–73. doi:10.1525/jps.2003.32.3.64. ISBN 978-1-412-81975-6. JSTOR 10.1525/jps.2003.32.3.64.
- Al Tahhan, Zena (2 February 2024). "Palestinian groups share testimonies of sexual assault, rape of prisoners". Al Jazeera. Archived from the original on 21 February 2024.
- "Al-Haq Launches Landmark Palestinian Coalition Report: 'Israeli Apartheid: Tool of Zionist Settler Colonialism'". Al-Haq. 29 November 2022. Archived from the original on 27 January 2024.
- Al-Krenawai, Alean; Graham, John R.; Sehwail, Mahmud A. (Spring 2004). "Mental Health and Violence/Trauma in Palestine: Implications for Helping Professional Practice". Journal of Comparative Family Studies. 35 (2): 185–209. doi:10.3138/jcfs.35.2.185. JSTOR 41603932.
- "Alarming increase of human rights violations against Palestinians in the occupied territory and against Palestinian citizens of Israel". International Federation for Human Rights. 9 November 2023. Archived from the original on 9 January 2024.
- Algazy, Joseph (Spring–Summer 1985). "Israeli Settlement Policy in the West Bank and the Gaza Strip". Arab Studies Quarterly. 7 (2–3): 62–73. JSTOR 41857769.
- Allabadi, Fadwa; Hardan, Tareq (2016). "Marriage, Split Residency, and the Separation Wall in Jerusalem". Jerusalem Quarterly (65). Institute for Palestine Studies: 69–85. doi:10.70190/jq.I65.p69.
- Aloni, Adam (December 2017). Made in Israel: Exploiting Palestinian Land for Treatment of Israeli Waste (PDF). B'Tselem. ISBN 978-965-7613-31-3. Archived (PDF) from the original on 20 January 2018.
- Amnesty International (Summer 1978). "Amnesty International Administrative Detention in Israel/Occupied Territories". Middle East Journal. 32 (3): 337–339. JSTOR 4325772.
- Amnesty International Report 2022/23 Israel and the Occupied Palestinian Territories (PDF) (Report). Amnesty International. 2023. pp. 206–210. ISBN 978-0-862-10502-0. Archived (PDF) from the original on 24 December 2023.
- Anthony, C. Ross; Egal, Daniel; Ries, Charles P.; Bond, Craig A.; Liepman, Andrew M.; Martini, Jeffrey; et al. (2015). The Costs of the Israeli-Palestinian Conflict (PDF). RAND Corporation. ISBN 978-0-833-09033-1. Archived (PDF) from the original on 14 August 2023.
- "Any Palestinian is exposed to monitoring by the Israeli Big Brother". The Guardian. 12 September 2014. Archived from the original on 26 May 2019.
- "Apartheid". B'Tselem. 12 January 2021. Archived from the original on 26 January 2024.
- Ariel, Handel (2014). "Gated/gating community: the settlement complex in the West Bank" (PDF). Transactions of the Institute of British Geographers. 39 (4): 504–517. Bibcode:2014TrIBG..39..504H. doi:10.1111/tran.12045. ISSN 0020-2754. Archived from the original (PDF) on 26 June 2021.
- Askew, Joshua (27 November 2023). "Israel 'stealing organs' from bodies in Gaza, alleges human rights group". Euronews. Archived from the original on 5 March 2024.
- Aswad, Henrietta (15 May 2007). "Checkpoints Compound the Risks of Childbirth for Palestinian Women". United Nations Population Fund. Archived from the original on 8 October 2019.
- Bahbah, Bishara A.; Butler, Linda (1986). Israel and Latin America: The Military Connection. Macmillan Publishers. ISBN 978-1-349-09193-5.
- Bar, Neta; Ben-Ari, Eyal (2005). "Israeli Snipers in the Al-Aqsa Intifada: Killing, Humanity and Lived Experience". Third World Quarterly. 26 (1): 133–152. doi:10.1080/0143659042000322955. JSTOR 3993768. S2CID 144521182.
- Bar-Siman-Tov, Yaacov (2007). "Dialectic Between Conflict Management and Conflict Resolution". In Bar-Siman-Tov, Yaacov (ed.). The Israeli-Palestinian Conflict: From Conflict Resolution to Conflict Management. Springer. pp. 9–39. ISBN 978-0-230-60311-0.
- Bar-Tal, Daniel; Alon, Ilai (2017). "Sociopsychological approach to Trust (or Distrust): Concluding Comments". In Bar-Tal, Daniel (ed.). The Role of Trust in Conflict Resolution: The Israeli-Palestinian Case and Beyond. Springer. pp. 311–333. ISBN 978-3-319-43355-4.
- Bar-Tal, Daniel; Salomon, Gavriel (2006). "Israeli-Jewish Narratives of the Israeli-Palestinian Conflict: Evolution, Contents, Functions and Consequences". In Rotberg, Robert I. (ed.). Israeli and Palestinian Narratives of Conflict: History's Double Helix. Indiana University Press. pp. 19–45. ISBN 978-0-253-21857-5.
- Baxendale, Sidney J. (Spring 1989). "Taxation of Income in Israel and the West Bank: A Comparative Study". Journal of Palestine Studies. 18 (3): 134–141. doi:10.2307/2537347. JSTOR 2537347.
- Beckouche, Pierre (2017). "Occupied Palestinian Territory". Europe's Mediterranean Neighbourhood. Edward Elgar Publishing. pp. 146–156. ISBN 978-1-786-43149-3. Archived from the original on 3 March 2023.
- Beinart, Peter (12 February 2014). "George Orwell and Israel's 'Democratic' Occupation of the West Bank". Haaretz. Archived from the original on 21 April 2019.
- Beinin, Joel (2004). "The New McCarthyism: Policing Thought about the Middle East". Race & Class. 46 (1): 101–115. doi:10.1177/0306396804045517. S2CID 143636285.
- Ben-Naftali, Orna; Gross, Aeyal M.; Michaeli, Keren (2005). "Illegal Occupation: Framing the Occupied Palestinian Territory" (PDF). Berkeley Journal of International Law. 23: 551.
- Ben-Naftali, Orna; Sfard, Michael; Viterbo, Hedi (2018). The ABC of the OPT: A Legal Lexicon of the Israeli Control over the Occupied Palestinian Territory. Cambridge University Press. ISBN 978-1-107-15652-4. Archived from the original on 3 March 2023.
- Ben-Simhon, Coby (20 September 2012). "Revealed: Israeli Taxpayers Helped Bankroll Illegal West Bank Outposts for Decades". Haaretz. Archived from the original on 26 July 2019.
- Benvenisti, Eyal (1984). Israeli Censorship of Arab Publications: A Survey (PDF). New York: Human Rights Watch. Archived (PDF) from the original on 12 March 2020.
- Benvenisti, Eyal (2012). The International Law of Occupation. Oxford University Press. ISBN 978-0-199-58889-3. Archived from the original on 3 March 2023.
- Benvenisti, Eyal; Zamir, Eyal (April 1995). "Private Claims to Property Rights in the Future Israeli-Palestinian Settlement". The American Journal of International Law. 89 (2): 295–340. doi:10.2307/2204205. JSTOR 2204205. S2CID 145317224.
- Berger, Miriam; Harb, Hajar (9 December 2023). "Israel is detaining civilians in Gaza. Many have disappeared, families say". The Washington Post. Archived from the original on 11 December 2023.
- Berger, Yotam (15 June 2017). "How Many Settlers Really Live in the West Bank? Haaretz Investigation Reveals". Haaretz. Archived from the original on 14 January 2020.
- Berger, Yotam (22 October 2018). "Revealed: Israeli Taxpayers Helped Bankroll Illegal West Bank Outposts for Decades". Haaretz. Archived from the original on 21 January 2020.
- Bergman, Ronen (2018). Rise and Kill First: The Secret History of Israel's Targeted Assassinations. Random House. ISBN 978-0-679-60468-6. Archived from the original on 3 March 2023.
- Berkes, Heidrun (2016). Economic development under occupation: A case study of the dairy sector in the Hebron governorate (PDF) (Thesis). Leiden University. Archived (PDF) from the original on 31 March 2019.
- Berman, Aaron (1992). Nazism, the Jews and American Zionism, 1933–1988. Wayne State University Press. ISBN 978-0-814-32232-1.
- Berman, Lazar (21 October 2022). "UN report denounces Israel's 'unlawful occupation,' demands prosecution of officials". The Times of Israel. Associated Press. Archived from the original on 11 February 2023.
- The Besieged Palestinian Agricultural Sector (PDF). UNCTAD. September 2015a. Archived (PDF) from the original on 28 August 2020.
- Bhavnani, Ravi; Miodownik, Dan; Choi, Hyun Jin (2011a). "Three Two Tango: Territorial Control and Selective Violence in Israel, the West Bank, and Gaza". The Journal of Conflict Resolution. 55 (1): 133–158. doi:10.1177/0022002710383663. JSTOR 25780770. S2CID 146164752.
- Bhavnani, Ravi; Miodownik, Dan; Choi, Hyun Jin (2011b). "Violence and Control in Civil Conflict: Israel, the West Bank, and Gaza". Comparative Politics. 44 (1): 61–80. doi:10.5129/001041510X13815229366561. JSTOR 23040658.
- Bishara, Amahl (August 2008). "Watching U.S. Television from the Palestinian Street: The Media, the State, and Representational Interventions". Cultural Anthropology. 23 (3): 488–530. doi:10.1111/j.1548-1360.2008.00016.x. JSTOR 20484514.
- Bishara, Amahl (2010). "Weapons, Passports, and News: Palestinian Perceptions of U.S. Power as a Mediator of War". In Kelly, John D; Jauregui, Beatrice; Mitchell, Sean T.; Walton, Jeremy (eds.). Anthropology and Global Counterinsurgency. University of Chicago Press. pp. 125–136. ISBN 978-0-226-42995-3.
- Bisharat, George Emile (2012). Palestinian Lawyers and Israeli Rule: Law and Disorder in the West Bank. University of Texas Press. ISBN 978-0-292-73984-0.
- Black, Ian (21 December 2009). "Doctor admits Israeli pathologists harvested organs without consent". The Guardian. Archived from the original on 12 April 2010.
- Black, Ian (2017). Enemies and Neighbours: Arabs and Jews in Palestine and Israel, 1917-2017. Penguin UK. ISBN 978-0-241-00443-2.
- Bob, Yonah Jeremy (2 November 2023). "Israel holding some 6,000 Palestinian prisoners, 'unlawful combatants'". The Jerusalem Post. Archived from the original on 30 December 2023.
- von Bockmann, James Lee (Fall 1999). "Review of Philosophical Perspectives on the Israeli-Palestinian Conflict by Tomis Kapitan". Arab Studies Quarterly. 21 (4): 105–109. JSTOR 41858312.
- Borger, Julian (22 February 2024). "Claims of Israeli sexual assault of Palestinian women are credible, UN panel says". The Guardian. ISSN 0261-3077. Archived from the original on 5 March 2024.
- Bowker, Robert P. (2003). Palestinian Refugees: Mythology, Identity, and the Search for Peace. Lynne Rienner Publishers. ISBN 978-1-588-26202-8.
- Braverman, Irus (Spring 2007). "Powers of Illegality: House Demolitions and Resistance in East Jerusalem". Law & Social Inquiry. 32 (2): 333–372. doi:10.1111/j.1747-4469.2007.00062.x. JSTOR 20108706. S2CID 145121175. Archived from the original on 19 February 2023.
- Braverman, Irus (September 2008). ""The Tree Is the Enemy Soldier": A Sociolegal Making of War Landscapes in the Occupied West Bank". Law & Society Review. 42 (3): 449–482. doi:10.1111/j.1540-5893.2008.00348.x. JSTOR 29734134. SSRN 1307044.
- Braverman, Irus (November 2009). "Uprooting Identities: The Regulation of Olive Trees in the Occupied West Bank". Political and Legal Anthropology Review. 32 (2): 237–264. doi:10.1111/j.1555-2934.2009.01061.x. JSTOR 24497464. Archived from the original on 19 February 2023.
- Bregman, Ahron (2014). Cursed Victory: A History of Israel and the Occupied Territories. Penguin UK. ISBN 978-1-846-14735-7.
- Brinkley, Joel (29 October 1989). "Inside the Intifada". The New York Times Magazine. Archived from the original on 6 November 2021.
- Brown, John (24 April 2017). "Arrest of Palestinians for Potential Terror Attacks Brings New Meaning to 'Minority Report'". Haaretz. Archived from the original on 17 June 2020.
- Byman, Daniel (March–April 2006). "Do Targeted Killings Work?". Foreign Affairs. Vol. 85, no. 2. pp. 95–111. JSTOR 20031914.
- Byman, Daniel (2011). A High Price: The Triumphs and Failures of Israeli Counterterrorism. Oxford University Press. p. 319. ISBN 978-0-199-83045-9 – via Internet Archive.
- Byman, Daniel; Sachs, Natan (September–October 2012). "The Rise of Settler Terrorism: The West Bank's Other Violent Extremists". Foreign Affairs. Vol. 91, no. 5. pp. 73–86. JSTOR 41720862.
- Careccia, Grazia; Reynolds, John J. (November 2006). al-Nu'man Village: a case study of indirect forcible transfer (PDF). Al-Haq. pp. 1–48. Archived from the original (PDF) on 19 April 2016.
- Castellino, Joshua; Cavanaugh, Kathleen A. (2013). Minority Rights in the Middle East. Oxford University Press. ISBN 978-0-191-66888-3.
- Chalom, Adam (2014). "Understanding a Religious Western Democracy: Israel and Its Complexities". In Pinn, A. (ed.). Theism and Public Policy: Humanist Perspectives and Responses. Springer. pp. 53–69. ISBN 978-1-137-46530-6.
- Chappell, Bill (1 February 2022). "Israel is an apartheid state, Amnesty International says". National Public Radio. Archived from the original on 13 January 2024.
- de Chatel, Francesca (2011). Water Sheikhs and Dam Builders: Stories of People and Water in the Middle East. Transaction Publishers. ISBN 978-1-412-80988-7.
- Cheshin, Amir; Hutman, Bill; Melamed, Avi (2009). Separate and Unequal. Harvard University Press. ISBN 978-0-674-02952-1.
- Children in Israeli Military Detention: Observations and Recommendations (PDF). UNICEF. February 2013. Archived from the original (PDF) on 30 September 2020.
- Chomsky, Noam; Achcar, Gilbert; Shalom, Stephan R. (2015). Perilous Power: The Middle East and U.S. Foreign Policy Dialogues on Terror, Democracy, War, and Justice. Routledge. ISBN 978-1-317-25430-0.
- Cohen, Amnon (1984). Jewish life under Islam: Jerusalem in the sixteenth century. Harvard University Press. ISBN 978-0-674-47436-9.
- Cohen, Esther Rosalind (1985). Human Rights in the Israeli-occupied Territories, 1967-1982. Manchester University Press. ISBN 978-0-719-01726-1.
- Cohen, Hillel (2010a). "The Matrix of surveillance in times of national conflict: the Israeli-Palestinian case". In Zureik, Elia; Lyon, David; Abu-Laban, Yasmeen (eds.). Surveillance and Control in Israel/Palestine: Population, Territory and Power. Routledge. pp. 99–111. ISBN 978-1-136-93097-3.
- Cohen, Samy (2010b). Israel's Asymmetric Wars. Springer. ISBN 978-0-230-11297-1.
- Cohen, Stephen P. (2009). Beyond America's Grasp: A Century of Failed Diplomacy in the Middle East. Farrar, Straus and Giroux. ISBN 978-1-429-94237-9.
- "Commission of Inquiry finds that the Israeli occupation is unlawful under international law". OHCHR. Archived from the original on 15 March 2023.
- Cook, Jonathan (2013a). Palestine: Israel's Experiments in Human Despair. Zed Books. ISBN 978-1-848-13649-6.
- Cook, Jonathan (September 2013b). ""The Lab": Israel Tests Weapons, Tactics On Captive Palestinian Population". WRMEA. pp. 16–17. Archived from the original on 25 January 2020.
- Cooley, John K. (Spring 1984). "The War over Water". Foreign Policy. No. 54. pp. 3–26. JSTOR 1148352.
- Cordesman, Anthony H. (2006). Arab-Israeli Military Forces in an Era of Asymmetric Wars. Greenwood Publishing Group. ISBN 978-0-275-99186-9.
- Cowell, Alan (11 October 1989). "Beit Sahur Journal: In a Tax War, Even the Olivewood Dove Is Seized". The New York Times. Archived from the original on 16 October 2019.
- Crowley, Michael; McLeish, Catriona; Revill, James (2018). "The Role of Civil Society in Combating the Development, Proliferation and Use of Chemical Weapons". In Shang, Lijun; Dando, Malcolm; Crowley, Michael (eds.). Preventing Chemical Weapons: Arms Control and Disarmament as the Sciences Converge. Royal Society of Chemistry. pp. 580–619. ISBN 978-1-782-62649-7.
- "Cruel and systematic violations of Palestinian rights in Israeli prisons: Report". Al Jazeera. 19 February 2024. Archived from the original on 21 February 2024.
- Cullinan, Maeve (21 February 2024). "Sexual violence against Palestinian women 'may be higher than first thought', says UN expert". The Daily Telegraph. Archived from the original on 5 March 2024.
- Davies, Philip E. (Spring 1979). "The Educated West Bank Palestinians". Journal of Palestine Studies. 8 (3): 65–80. doi:10.2307/2536225. JSTOR 2536225.
- De Waart, P. J. I. M (1994). Dynamics of Self-determination in Palestine: Protection of Peoples as a Human Rights. Brill. ISBN 978-9-004-09825-1.
- "Deadly Exchange: The Dangerous Consequences of American Law Enforcement Trainings in Israel" (PDF). RAIA/Jewish Voice for Peace. September 2018. Archived (PDF) from the original on 4 January 2024.
- Denes, Nick (2010). "From tanks to wheelchairs: unmanned aerial vehicles, Zionist battlefield experiments, and the transparence of the civilian". In Zureik, Elia; Lyon, David; Abu-Laban, Yasmeen (eds.). Surveillance and Control in Israel/Palestine: Population, Territory and Power. Routledge. pp. 171–195. ISBN 978-1-136-93097-3.
- Dinstein, Yoram (2009). The International Law of Belligerent Occupation. Cambridge University Press. ISBN 978-0-521-89637-5.
- Domb, Fania (2007). "The Separation Fence in the International Court of Justice and the High Court of Justice: Commonalities, Differences and Specifics". In Schmitt, Michael N.; Pejic, Jelena (eds.). International Law and Armed Conflict: Exploring the Faultlines: Essays in Honour of Yoram Dinstein. Martinus Nijhoff Publishers. pp. 509–542. ISBN 978-90-47-42125-2. Archived from the original on 3 March 2023.
- Drew, Catriona J. (1997). "Self-Determination, Population Transfer and the Middle East Peace Accords". In Bowen, Stephen (ed.). Human Rights, Self-Determination and Political Change in the Occupied Palestinian Territories. Martinus Nijhoff Publishers. pp. 119–167. ISBN 978-9-041-10502-8.
- Dumper, Michael (2010). "Constructive Ambiguities: Jerusalem, international law, and the peace process". In Akram, Susan; Dumper, Michael; Lynk, Michael; Scobbie, Iain (eds.). International Law and the Israeli-Palestinian Conflict: A Rights-Based Approach to Middle East Peace. Taylor & Francis. ISBN 978-1-136-85097-4.
- Dwoskin, Elizabeth (8 November 2021). "Israel escalates surveillance of Palestinians with facial recognition program in West Bank". The Washington Post. Archived from the original on 25 January 2024.
- Dzikansky, Mordecai; Kleiman, Gil; Slater, Robert (2016). Terrorist Suicide Bombings: Attack Interdiction, Mitigation, and Response. CRC Press. ISBN 978-1-439-87132-4.
- The economic costs of the Israeli occupation for the occupied Palestinian territory (PDF). ARIJ and the Palestinian Ministry of National Economy (PMNE). September 2011. Archived from the original (PDF) on 29 January 2021.
- Economic Costs of the Israeli occupation for the Palestinian people (PDF). UNCTAD. 21 July 2016. Archived (PDF) from the original on 16 May 2017.
- Efrat, Elisha (2006). The West Bank and Gaza Strip: A Geography of Occupation and Disengagement. Routledge. ISBN 978-1-134-17217-7. Archived from the original on 3 March 2023.
- "Egregious acts of torture, abuse committed by Israeli army against Palestinian civilians in the West Bank". Geneva: Euro-Mediterranean Human Rights Monitor. 1 November 2023. Archived from the original on 28 November 2023.
- Ehrenreich, Ben (2016). The Way to the Spring: Life and Death in Palestine. Granta Books. ISBN 978-1-783-78312-0.
- El-Ahmed, Nabila; Abu-Zahra, Nadia (Spring 2016). "Unfulfilled Promise: Palestinian Family Reunification and the Right of Return". Journal of Palestine Studies. 45 (3): 24–39. doi:10.1525/jps.2016.45.3.24. JSTOR 4284056.
- El-Farra, Majed; MacMillen, Malcolm (January 2000). "External Constraints on Manufacturing Development in Israeli-Occupied Gaza". Middle Eastern Studies. 36 (1): 153–170. doi:10.1080/00263200008701302. JSTOR 4284056. S2CID 144822037.
- Escobedo, Tricia (19 August 2009). "Swedish paper's organ harvesting article draws Israeli outrage". CNN. Archived from the original on 15 February 2024.
- Escribano, Marisa; El-Joubeh, Nazmi (Autumn 1981). "Migration and Change in a West Bank Village: The Case of Deir Dibwan". Journal of Palestine Studies. 11 (1): 150–160. doi:10.2307/2536052. JSTOR 2536052.
- Falah, Ghazi-Walid (2005). "The Geopolitics of 'Enclavisation' and the Demise of a Two-State Solution to the Israeli-Palestinian Conflict". Third World Quarterly. 26 (8): 1341–1372. doi:10.1080/01436590500255007. JSTOR 4017718. S2CID 154697979.
- Falk, Richard (Winter 2002). "Azmi Bishara, the Right of Resistance, and the Palestinian Ordeal". Journal of Palestine Studies. 31 (2): 19–33. doi:10.1525/jps.2002.31.2.19. JSTOR 10.1525/jps.2002.31.2.19.
- Farsakh, Leila (Spring 2005). "Independence, Cantons, or Bantustans: Whither the Palestinian State?". Middle East Journal. 59 (2): 230–245. doi:10.3751/59.2.13. JSTOR 4330126.
- "Fatalities". B'Tselem. 12 May 2011. Archived from the original on 5 January 2010.
- "Fatalities before Operation "Cast Lead"". B'Tselem. Archived from the original on 20 January 2018.
- Feldinger, Lauren Gelfond (13 April 2013). "The politics of water: Palestinians bracing for another dry summer". Haaretz. Archived from the original on 3 June 2015.
- Fields, Gary (2017). Enclosure: Palestinian Landscapes in a Historical Mirror. University of California Press. ISBN 978-0-520-29104-1. Archived from the original on 7 March 2024.
- Findlay, Len (2010). "Academic and Artistic Freedom and the Israel-Palestine Conflict: Towards a Canadian Pedagogy of the Suppressed". Cultural and Pedagogical Inquiry. 2 (2): 5–18. ISSN 1916-3460. Archived from the original on 7 March 2024.
- Finkelstein, Norman (Winter 1991). "Israel and Iraq: A Double Standard". Journal of Palestine Studies. 20 (2): 43–56. doi:10.2307/2537197. JSTOR 2537197.
- Finkelstein, Norman (2003). Image and Reality of the Israel-Palestine Conflict. Verso Books. ISBN 978-1-85984-442-7. Archived from the original on 7 March 2024.
- Fisk, Robert (23 August 2018). "Israel is building another 1,000 homes on Palestinian land. Where's the outrage?". The Independent. Archived from the original on 22 December 2019.
- Francis, Sahar (Summer 2014). "Status of Palestinian Prisoners in International Humanitarian Law". Journal of Palestine Studies. 43 (4): 39–48. doi:10.1525/jps.2014.43.4.39. ISBN 978-1-466-80054-0. JSTOR 10.1525/jps.2014.43.4.39.
- Freilich, Charles D. (2018). Israeli National Security: A New Strategy for an Era of Change. Oxford University Press. ISBN 978-0-190-60293-2. Archived from the original on 7 March 2024.
- Friedman, Robert (Autumn 1983). "Israeli Censorship of the Palestinian Press". Journal of Palestine Studies. 13 (1): 93–101. doi:10.2307/2536927. JSTOR 2536927.
- Galchinsky, Michael (Fall 2004). "The Jewish Settlements in the West Bank: International Law and Israeli Jurisprudence". Israel Studies. 9 (3): 115–136. doi:10.2979/ISR.2004.9.3.115. JSTOR 30245641. S2CID 144282494. Archived from the original on 9 April 2023.
- Gallo, Giorgio; Marzano, Arturo (2009). "The Dynamics of Asymmetric Conflicts: The Israeli-Palestinian Case". The Journal of Conflict Studies. 29: 1–18. Archived from the original on 2 January 2024.
- Galnoor, Itzhak (2010). Public Management in Israel: Development, Structure, Functions and Reforms. Routledge. ISBN 978-1-136-92386-9. Archived from the original on 7 March 2024.
- Galtung, Johan (1971). "The Middle East and the Theory of Conflict". Journal of Peace Research. 8 (3–4): 173–206. doi:10.1177/002234337100800301. JSTOR 423072. S2CID 110763655.
- Gautney, Heather (2009). "The Globalization of Violence in the 21st Century: Israel, Palestine, and the War on Terror". In Aronowitz, Stanley; Gautney, Heather (eds.). Implicating Empire. Hachette UK. pp. 65–82. ISBN 978-0-786-74992-8. Archived from the original on 7 March 2024.
- Gazit, Shlomo (2003). Trapped Fools: Thirty Years of Israeli Policy in the Territories. Frank Cass Publisher. ISBN 978-0-714-65489-8. Archived from the original on 7 March 2024.
- "Generation after generation, Israeli prison marks a rite of passage for Palestinian boys". Associated Press. 6 December 2023. Archived from the original on 7 December 2023.
- Gerstenfeld, Manfred; Green, Ben (Fall 2004). "Watching the Pro-Israeli Media Watchers". Jewish Political Studies Review. 16 (3–4): 33–58. JSTOR 25834603.
- Ghanim, Honaida (2017). "From Kubaniya to Outpost: A Genealogy of the Palestinian conceptualization of Jewish Settlement in a Shifting National Context". In Handel, Ariel; Allegra, Marco; Maggor, Erez (eds.). Normalizing Occupation: The Politics of Everyday Life in the West Bank Settlements. Indiana University Press. pp. 151–170. ISBN 978-0-253-02505-0.
- Gleim, Sarah (12 November 2015). "Skunk Water: A Weapon That Uses Stench to Control Crowds". HowStuffWorks. Archived from the original on 27 August 2019.
- Glock, Albert (Spring 1994). "Archaeology as Cultural Survival: The Future of the Palestinian Past". Journal of Palestine Studies. 23 (3): 70–84. doi:10.2307/2537961. JSTOR 2537961.
- Goldberg, J.J. (3 November 2014). "106 Retired Israeli Generals, Spy Chiefs Urge Netanyahu to Push for Peace". Haaretz. Archived from the original on 31 March 2019.
- Goldstein, Michael (Winter 1978). "Israeli Security Measures in the Occupied Territories: Administrative Detention". Middle East Journal. 32 (1): 35–44. JSTOR 4325711.
- Gordis, Avishay Ben-Sasson; Levi, Yonatan (12 December 2017). Israel's National Security and West Bank Settlements (PDF). Molad. Archived (PDF) from the original on 6 January 2024.
- Gordon, Neve (2008). Israel's Occupation. University of California Press. ISBN 978-0-520-94236-3.
- Gordon, Neve (2010). "Israel's emergence as a homeland security capital". In Zureik, Elia; Lyon, David; Abu-Laban, Yasmeen (eds.). Surveillance and Control in Israel/Palestine: Population, Territory and Power. Routledge. pp. 153–169. ISBN 978-1-136-93097-3.
- Gordon, Neve (June 2014). "Human Rights as a Security Threat: Lawfare and the Campaign against Human RightsNGOs". Law & Society Review. 48 (2): 311–344. doi:10.1111/lasr.12074. JSTOR 43670395.
- Gorenberg, Gershom (2007). The Accidental Empire: Israel and the Birth of the Settlements, 1967-1977. Macmillan Publishers. ISBN 978-1-466-80054-0.
- Grace, Anne (Winter 1990). "The Tax Resistance at Bayt Sahur". Journal of Palestine Studies. 19 (2): 99–107. doi:10.2307/2537416. JSTOR 2537416.
- Graff, James A. (2015). "Targeting Children: Rights versus Realpolitik". In Kapitan, Tomis (ed.). Philosophical Perspectives on the Israeli-Palestinian Conflict (2nd ed.). Routledge. pp. 157–184. ISBN 978-1-317-46285-9.
- Graham, Stephen (2010). "Laboratories of War: surveillance and US-Israeli collaboration in war and security". In Zureik, Elia; Lyon, David; Abu-Laban, Yasmeen (eds.). Surveillance and Control in Israel/Palestine: Population, Territory and Power. Routledge. pp. 133–152. ISBN 978-1-136-93097-3. Archived from the original on 7 March 2024.
- Grinberg, Lev Luis (2009). Politics and Violence in Israel/Palestine: Democracy Versus Military Rule. Routledge. ISBN 978-1-135-27589-1. Archived from the original on 7 March 2024.
- Gross, Judah Ari (6 September 2018). "Israel to close West Bank, Gaza during upcoming holidays". The Times of Israel. Archived from the original on 25 May 2019.
- Hajjar, Lisa (2005). Courting Conflict: The Israeli Military Court System in the West Bank and Gaza. University of California Press. ISBN 978-0-520-24194-7. Archived from the original on 7 March 2024.
- Hajjar, Lisas (Autumn 2006). "International Humanitarian Law and "Wars on Terror": A Comparative Analysis of Israeli and American Doctrines and Policies". Journal of Palestine Studies. 36 (1): 21–42. doi:10.1525/jps.2006.36.1.21. JSTOR 10.1525/jps.2006.36.1.21. S2CID 155193067.
- Halper, Jeff (2015). War Against the People: Israel, the Palestinians and Global Pacification. Pluto Press. ISBN 978-0-745-33430-1.
- Halper, Jeff (19 June 2020). "Israelizing the American police, Palestinianizing the American people". Mondoweiss. Archived from the original on 8 April 2023.
- Handel, Ariel (2008). "Where to, and When in the Occupied Territories: An Introduction to the Geography of Disaster" ( (PDF)). In Ophir, Adi; Givoni, Michal; Hanafi, Sari (eds.). The Power of Inclusive Exclusion: Anatomy of the Israeli Rule in the Occupied Territories. Zone Books. pp. 179–222. ISBN 978-1-890951-92-4. Archived from the original on 3 February 2019.
- Handel, Ariel (2010). "Exclusionary surveillance and spatial uncertainty in the occupied Palestinian territories". In Zureik, Elia; Lyon, David; Abu-Laban, Yasmeen (eds.). Surveillance and Control in Israel/Palestine: Population, Territory and Power. Routledge. pp. 259–274. ISBN 978-1-136-93097-3.
- Handel, Ariel (2014). "Gated/gating community: the settlement complex in the West Bank" (PDF). Transactions of the Institute of British Geographers. 39 (4): 504–517. Bibcode:2014TrIBG..39..504H. doi:10.1111/tran.12045. Archived from the original (PDF) on 30 September 2020.
- Harel, Amos (3 September 2003). "IDF's Guidelines for Field Officers in the Territories: Respect Palestinian Civilians and Use Common Sense". Haaretz. Archived from the original on 12 March 2020.
- Harel, Amos (5 June 2017). "Settlements Do Not Serve Israel's Security Needs, Say Former Generals". Haaretz. Archived from the original on 12 May 2019.
- Hareuveni, Eyal (June 2009). Foul Play Neglect of Wastewater Treatment in the West Bank (PDF) (Report). Translated by Zvi Shulman. B'Tselem. Archived (PDF) from the original on 30 January 2019.
- Hareuveni, Eyal (May 2011). Dispossession and Exploitation: Israel's Policy in the Jordan Valley and Northern Dead Sea (PDF). B'Tselem. Archived (PDF) from the original on 31 January 2024.
- Hass, Amira (2000). Drinking the Sea at Gaza: Days and Nights in a Land under Siege. Owl Books. ISBN 978-0-8050-5740-9.
- Hass, Amira (Spring 2002). "Israel's Closure Policy: an Ineffective Strategy of Containment and Repression". Journal of Palestine Studies. 31 (3): 5–20. doi:10.1525/jps.2002.31.3.5. JSTOR 10.1525/jps.2002.31.3.5.
- Hass, Amira (29 January 2018a). "Israeli Soldiers in West Bank: Raiding, Arresting, Mapping and Getting Home for Shabbat". Haaretz. Archived from the original on 8 March 2020.
- Hass, Amira (13 October 2018b). "Israel Seeks to Deport to Brazil Man Who Has Lived Almost Entire Life in West Bank". Haaretz. Archived from the original on 3 May 2023.
- Hasson, Nir (19 May 2019). "Israeli West Bank Archaeological Digs Must Not Be Made Public, Top Court Rules". Haaretz. Archived from the original on 20 December 2019.
- Hasson, Nir (9 September 2021). "The Unexpected Reason Israel Is Improving Conditions for Jerusalem Palestinians". Haaretz. Archived from the original on 29 December 2022.
- Hearst, Katherine (19 February 2024). "Palestinian women and girls raped and sexually assaulted in Israeli detention, UN experts say". Middle East Eye. Archived from the original on 2 March 2024.
- Henckaerts, Jean-Marie; Doswald-Beck, Louise; Alvermann, Carolin (2005). Starvation and Access to Humanitarian Relief Customary International Humanitarian Law: pt. 1–2. Practice. Cambridge University Press. ISBN 978-0-521-83937-2. Archived from the original on 7 March 2024.
- Henriksen, Thomas H. (February 2007). The Israeli Approach to Irregular Warfare and its Implications for the United (PDF). ISOU. ISBN 978-1-933749-06-8. Archived (PDF) from the original on 23 February 2017.
- Hirschhorn, Sara Yael (2017). City on a Hilltop: American Jews and the Israeli Settler Movement. Harvard University Press. ISBN 978-0-674-97505-7.
- Hoffnung, Menachem; Weinshall–Margel, Keren (2010). "Judicial Rejection as Substantial Relief: The Israeli Supreme Court and the "War on Terror"". In Volcansek, Mary L.; Stack, John F. (eds.). Courts and Terrorism: Nine Nations Balance Rights and Security. Cambridge University Press. pp. 150–167. ISBN 978-1-139-49537-0. Archived from the original on 7 March 2024.
- Holmes, Oliver (27 April 2021). "Israel is committing the crime of apartheid, rights group says". The Guardian. Archived from the original on 2 February 2022.
- Hovsepian, Mary (2015). "Demography of Race and Ethnicity in Palestine". In Sáenz, Rogelio; Embrick, David G; Rodríguez, Néstor P. (eds.). The International Handbook of the Demography of Race and Ethnicity. Springer. pp. 339–352. ISBN 978-9-048-18891-8. Archived from the original on 7 March 2024.
- "How Dispossession Happens: The Humanitarian Impact of the Takeover of Palestinian Water Springs by Israeli Settlers" (PDF). Office for the Coordination of Humanitarian Affairs occupied Palestinian territory. March 2012. Archived (PDF) from the original on 29 April 2023.
- "HRW says inhumane treatment of Palestinian detainees amounts to 'war crime'". Al Jazeera. 11 December 2023. Archived from the original on 12 December 2023.
- Hulme, Karen (2004). War Torn Environment: Interpreting The Legal Threshold. Martinus Nijhoff Publishers. ISBN 978-9-004-13848-3. Archived from the original on 7 March 2024.
- "Human rights in Israel and Occupied Palestinian Territories 2022". Amnesty International. Archived from the original on 11 October 2023.
- Hunt, Naomi, ed. (2013). Use With Care: A Reporter's Glossary of Loaded Language in the Israeli-Palestinian Conflict (PDF). International Press Institute. ISBN 978-3-9503007-9-6. Archived (PDF) from the original on 9 December 2023.
- Hutchison, E. H. (1956). Violent Truce – A Military Observer Looks at the Arab-Israeli Conflict 1951–1955. The Devin – Adair Company. pp. 12–16 – via Internet Archive.
- ICG (20 December 2012). Extreme Makeover? (II): The Withering of Arab Jerusalem (PDF). International Crisis Group. Archived from the original (PDF) on 12 May 2019.
- "ICJ sets dates for submission of statements on Israel's practices in the occupied Palestinian territories". WAFA. Wafa. 9 February 2023. Archived from the original on 9 February 2023.
- Imseis, Ardi (Autumn 2000). "Review: Law, Reality, and the Oslo 'Peace' Process". Oxford Journal of Legal Studies. 20 (3): 469–476. doi:10.1093/ojls/20.3.469. JSTOR 20468333.
- Imseis, Ardi (2020). "Negotiating the Illegal: On the United Nations and the Illegal Occupation of Palestine, 1967–2020". European Journal of International Law. 31 (3): 1055–1085. doi:10.1093/ejil/chaa055. ISSN 0938-5428. Archived from the original on 16 November 2023.
- "In Israeli army camps, Gazan detainees subjected to torture and degrading treatment". Geneva: Euro-Med Human Rights Monitor. 7 January 2024. Archived from the original on 10 January 2024.
- Inbar, Efraim (2007). Israel's National Security: Issues and Challenges Since the Yom Kippur War. Routledge. ISBN 978-1-134-05939-3. Archived from the original on 7 March 2024.
- Irish Centre for Human Rights at the University of Galway, commissioned by the United Nations Committee on the Exercise of the Inalienable Rights of the Palestinian People (2023). The Legality of the Israeli Occupation of the Occupied Palestinian Territory, Including East Jerusalem (PDF) (Report). United Nations. pp. 31–36. Archived (PDF) from the original on 5 January 2024 – via ReliefWeb.
- Isaac, Jad; Khalil, Manal; Rishmawi, Khaldoun; Dabouqi, Ahmad; Marinelli, Ludovico (2015). The Economic Cost of the Israeli Occupation of the occupied Palestinian Territories (PDF). ARIJ. Archived from the original (PDF) on 10 August 2020.
- Isaac, Rami (2013). "Palestine: Tourism Under Occupation". In Butler, Richard; Suntikul, Wantanee (eds.). Tourism and War. Routledge. pp. 143–158. ISBN 978-1-136-26309-5.
- Israel 2022 Human Rights Report: Executive Summary (PDF). United States Department of State. 2023. pp. 1–69. Archived (PDF) from the original on 12 December 2023.
- "Israel and Occupied Palestinian Territories" (PDF). Amnesty International Report 2017/18: The State of the World's Human Rights. Amnesty International. 2018b. pp. 207–211. ISBN 978-0-86210-499-3. Archived (PDF) from the original on 26 May 2020.
- "Israel formally declares war, approves 'significant' steps to retaliate for Hamas attack". CBC News. Associated Press. 8 October 2023. Archived from the original on 8 October 2023.
- "Israel harvested organs in '90s without consent". NBC News. Associated Press. 21 December 2009. Archived from the original on 29 January 2024.
- "Israel harvesting organs from Palestinian bodies, say Gaza officials". The New Arab. 27 November 2023. Archived from the original on 15 February 2024.
- "Israel holds over 1,200 detainees without charge. That's the most in 3 decades, a rights group says". ABC News. 1 August 2023. Archived from the original on 29 August 2023.
- "Israel/Gaza: Donors Should Press Israel to End Blockade". Human Rights Watch. 1 March 2009. Archived from the original on 15 February 2024. "Human Rights Watch said that the blockade, which has been in place since June 2007, after Hamas took control of Gaza, amounts to collective punishment of the civilian population, a serious violation of international humanitarian law."
- "Israel/occupied Palestinian territory: UN experts deplore attacks on civilians, call for truce and urge international community to address root causes of violence". Office of the United Nations High Commissioner for Human Rights. 12 October 2023. Archived from the original on 14 October 2023.
- "Israel/OPT: Horrifying cases of torture and degrading treatment of Palestinian detainees amid spike in arbitrary arrests". Amnesty International. 8 November 2023. Archived from the original on 10 December 2023.
- "Israel/oPt: UN experts appalled by reported human rights violations against Palestinian women and girls" (Press release). Geneva: Office of the United Nations High Commissioner for Human Rights. 19 February 2024. Archived from the original on 19 February 2024.
- "Israel: 50 Years of Occupation Abuses". Human Rights Watch. 4 June 2017a. Archived from the original on 14 February 2020.
- "Israel: Gaza Workers Held Incommunicado for Weeks". Human Rights Watch. 3 January 2024. Archived from the original on 11 January 2024.
- "Israel: Jerusalem Palestinians Stripped of Status". Human Rights Watch. 8 August 2017b. Archived from the original on 8 August 2019.
- "Israeli authorities must end collective punishment of Palestinians in Hebronm protect human rights defenders in the city" (PDF). Amnesty International. 25 February 2016. pp. 1–6. Archived (PDF) from the original on 19 March 2017.
- "Israeli forces suppress Friday protests in Kafr Qaddum". Ma'an News Agency. 17 November 2017. Archived from the original on 31 March 2019.
- "Israeli jailed over baby tragedy". BBC News. 12 September 2008. Archived from the original on 18 May 2019.
- "Israeli military night-raids on Palestinian residences in the West Bank and East Jerusalem" (PDF). Women's Centre for Legal Aid and Counselling. 26 June 2015. Archived (PDF) from the original on 16 March 2017.
- "The Israeli Permit Regime: Realities and Challenges" (PDF). ARIJ. 2018. pp. 1–31. Archived from the original (PDF) on 25 June 2021.
- "Israel's AI-powered 'mass assassination factory'". Al Jazeera. 22 December 2023. Archived from the original on 9 January 2024.
- "Israel's apartheid against Palestinians". Amnesty International. 1 February 2022. Archived from the original on 7 November 2023.
- "Israel's Settlements Have No Legal Validity, Constitute Flagrant Violation of International Law, Security Council Reaffirms". United Nations Security Council. 23 December 2016. Archived from the original on 22 February 2020.
- Jamjoum, Lama (2002). "The Effects of Israeli Violations During the Second Uprising "Intifada" on Palestinian Health Conditions". Social Justice. 29 (3): 53–72. JSTOR 29768136.
- "The Jordan Valley". B'Tselem. 11 November 2017c. Archived from the original on 22 April 2020.
- Joyce, Tom (12 April 2016). "The Palestinian farmers battling border restrictions and lack of water". The Guardian. Archived from the original on 18 September 2019.
- Kadmon, Sima (5 December 2016). "Hebron shooting: A micromodel of Israel's maladies". Ynetnews. Archived from the original on 26 April 2019.
- Kadri, Ali (Autumn 1998). "A Survey of Commuting Labor from the West Bank to Israel". Middle East Journal. 52 (4): 517–530. JSTOR 4329251.
- Kamrava, Mehran (2016). The Impossibility of Palestine: History, Geography, and the Road Ahead. Yale University Press. ISBN 978-0-300-22085-8. Archived from the original on 3 March 2023.
- Kane, Alex (7 July 2016). "Post Share Arrest: Israel targeting Palestinian Protestors on Facebook". The Intercept. Archived from the original on 9 February 2024.
- Kanonich, Yonatan (December 2017). Stahl, Ziv; Amihai, Lior; Wijler, Miryam (eds.). "Through the Lens of Israel's Interests: The Civil Administration in the West Bank" (PDF). Position paper. Yesh Din. Archived (PDF) from the original on 26 January 2023.
- Kaplan, Amy (2018). Our American Israel: The Story of an Entangled Alliance. Harvard University Press. ISBN 978-0-674-98992-4. Archived from the original on 7 March 2024.
- Karayanni, Michael (2014). Conflicts in a Conflict: A Conflict of Laws Case Study on Israel and the Palestinian Territories. Oxford University Press. ISBN 978-0-199-87371-5. Archived from the original on 5 February 2024.
- Kårtveit, Bård (2014). Dilemmas of Attachment: Identity and Belonging among Palestinian Christians. Brill. ISBN 978-9-004-27639-0. Archived from the original on 7 March 2024.
- Kattenburg, David (8 October 2021). "How Apartheid Israel stifles Palestinian education and scientific research Mondoweiss". Mondoweiss. Archived from the original on 8 April 2023.
- Kelly, Tobias (November 2004). "Returning Home? Law, Violence, and Displacement among West Bank Palestinians". Political and Legal Anthropology Review. 27 (2): 95–112. doi:10.1525/pol.2004.27.2.95. JSTOR 24497425.
- Kelly, Tobias (2006). Law, Violence and Sovereignty Among West Bank Palestinians. Cambridge University Press. ISBN 978-1-139-46099-6. Archived from the original on 7 March 2024.
- Khalil, Asem; Del Sarto, Raffaella A. (2015). "The Legal Fragmentation of Palestine-Israel and European Union Policies Promoting the Rule of Law". In Del Sarto, Raffaella A. (ed.). Fragmented Borders, Interdependence and External Relations: The Israel-Palestine-European Union Triangle. Palgrave. pp. 129–154. ISBN 978-1-137-50413-5. Archived from the original on 7 March 2024.
- Kidron, Peretz (2013). Refusenik!: Israel's Soldiers of Conscience. Zed Books. ISBN 978-1-84813-766-0. Archived from the original on 7 March 2024.
- Kimmerling, Baruch (2003). Politicide: Ariel Sharon's War Against the Palestinians. Verso Books. p. 16. ISBN 978-1-859-84517-2 – via Internet Archive.
- King, Mary Elizabeth (2009). "Palestinian Civil Resistance Against Israeli Military Occupation". In Stephan, Maria J. (ed.). Civilian Jihad: Nonviolent Struggle, Democratization, and Governance in the Middle East. PalgraveMacmillan. pp. 131–156. ISBN 978-0-230-10175-3. Archived from the original on 7 March 2024.
- Klieman, Aharon (2013). "Israel and the Middle East: on the unresolved matter of Israel's foreign policy orientation". In Tal, David (ed.). Israeli Identity: Between Orient and Occident. Routledge. pp. 26–50. ISBN 978-1-134-10738-4. Archived from the original on 7 March 2024.
- Kober, Avi (2002). Coalition Defection: The Dissolution of Arab Anti-Israeli Coalitions in War and Peace. Greenwood Publishing Group. ISBN 978-0-275-97722-1. Archived from the original on 7 March 2024.
- Kohavi, Itai; Nowiak, Wojciech (15 December 2017). "The Impact of West Bank Settlements on Israeli National Security". Przegląd Strategiczny (10): 157–172. doi:10.14746/ps.2017.1.8. hdl:10593/22378. ISSN 2084-6991. Archived from the original on 29 November 2023.
- Koren, David (13 September 2018). "The desire of eastern Jerusalem Arabs to integrate in Israeli society outweighs the threats of the Palestinian Authority". JISS. Archived from the original on 13 July 2022.
- Krämer, Gudrun (2011). A History of Palestine: From the Ottoman Conquest to the Founding of the State of Israel. Princeton University Press. ISBN 978-0-691-15007-9. Archived from the original on 7 March 2024.
- Kubovich, Yaniv (24 March 2022). "Israeli Troops' New Quota: Add 50 Palestinians to Tracking Database Every Shift". Haaretz. Archived from the original on 16 May 2022.
- Kumaraswamy, P.R. (2015). Historical Dictionary of the Arab-Israeli Conflict. Historical Dictionaries of War, Revolution, and Civil Unrest. Rowman & Littlefield. ISBN 978-1-4422-5170-0. Archived from the original on 7 March 2024.
- Kuntsman, Adi; Stein, Rebecca (2015). Digital militarism: Israel's occupation in the social media age. Stanford University Press. ISBN 978-0-804-79497-8. Archived from the original on 7 March 2024.
- Lazar, Hadara (February 1990). The system of taxation in the West Bank and Gaza Strip as an instrument for the enforcement of Authority during the Uprising (DOC) (Report). B'Tselem. ISSN 0792-4003. Archived from the original on 3 September 2010.
- Lazaroff, Tovah (2 July 2018). "U.N. expert: Israel moving closer to formal West Bank annexation". The Jerusalem Post. Archived from the original on 19 December 2019.
- Lazaroff, Tovah (21 October 2022). "Lapid: UN's CIO report is antisemitic and written by antisemites". The Jerusalem Post. Archived from the original on 4 May 2023.
- Legal Consequences of the Construction of a Wall in the Occupied Palestinian Territory (PDF). International Court of Justice. 9 July 2004. Archived from the original (PDF) on 13 September 2020.
- Lein, Yehezkel; Weizman, Eyal (May 2002). Land Grab: Israel's Settlement Policy in the West Bank (PDF) (Report). B'Tselem. Archived (PDF) from the original on 10 September 2019.
- Lentin, Ronit (2018). Traces of Racial Exception: Racializing Israeli Settler Colonialism. Bloomsbury Publishing. ISBN 978-1-350-03205-7. Archived from the original on 7 March 2024.
- Lesch, Ann M. (Winter 1979). "Israeli Deportation of Palestinians from the West Bank and the Gaza Strip, 1967-1978". Journal of Palestine Studies. 8 (2): 101–131. doi:10.2307/2536512. JSTOR 2536512.
- Levanon, Ofer Shinar (September 2015). Ethos of the Israeli-Palestinian Conflict as Reflected by the Judgments of the Israeli Supreme Court 1948 – 2006 (PDF) (PhD thesis). Hebrew University of Jerusalem. Archived (PDF) from the original on 9 April 2023.
- LeVine, Mark (2005). Overthrowing Geography: Jaffa, Tel Aviv, and the Struggle for Palestine, 1880–1948. University of California Press. ISBN 978-0-520-93850-2. Archived from the original on 7 March 2024.
- Levinson, Chaim (24 January 2017). "Torture, Israeli-style - as Described by the Interrogators Themselves". Haaretz. Archived from the original on 21 October 2019.
- Levy, Gideon; Levac, Alex (30 August 2019). "'This Place Is Only for Jews': The West Bank's Apartheid Springs". Haaretz.
- Lewis, Simon; Pamuk, Humeyra (13 February 2024). "US reviewing reports of civilian harm by Israel, State Dept says". Reuters. Archived from the original on 15 February 2024.
- Likhovski, Assaf (2017). Tax Law and Social Norms in Mandatory Palestine and Israel. Cambridge University Press. ISBN 978-1-316-82019-3. Archived from the original on 7 March 2024.
- Lonergan, Stephen C. (1996). "Water Resources and Conflict: Examples from the Middle East". In Gleditsch, Nils Petter (ed.). Conflict and the Environment. International Development Research Centre/ North Atlantic Treaty Organization. Scientific Affairs Division. pp. 375–384. ISBN 978-0-792-34768-2. Archived from the original on 7 March 2024.
- Lukacs, Yehuda (1999). Israel, Jordan, and the Peace Process. Syracuse University Press. ISBN 978-0-815-62855-2.
- Lustick, Ian (2018). Unsettled States, Disputed Lands: Britain and Ireland, France and Algeria, Israel and the West Bank-Gaza. Cornell University Press. ISBN 978-1-501-73194-5.
- Macintyre, Donald (14 June 2008). "Palestinians barred from Dead Sea beaches to 'appease Israeli settlers'". The Independent. Archived from the original on 22 April 2019.
- Makdisi, Saree (2010). Palestine Inside Out: An Everyday Occupation. W. W. Norton & Company. ISBN 978-0-393-06996-9. Archived from the original on 3 March 2023.
- Malki, Riad (2000). "The Physical Planning of Jerusalem". In Maʻoz, Moshe; Nusseibeh, Sari (eds.). Jerusalem: Points Beyond Friction, and Beyond. Kluwer Law International. pp. 25–63. ISBN 978-90-411-8843-4. OCLC 43481699. Archived from the original on 5 February 2024.
- Maltz, Judy (23 June 2017). "Americans Disproportionately Leading the Charge in Settling the West Bank". Haaretz. Archived from the original on 13 January 2020.
- Mansour, Antoine (2015). "The West Bank Economy: 1948–1984". In Abed, George T. (ed.). The Palestinian Economy: Studies in Development under Prolonged Occupation. Routledge. pp. 71–. ISBN 978-1-317-59291-4. Archived from the original on 3 March 2023.
- Maoz, Moshe (2015). Palestinian Leadership on the West Bank. Routledge. ISBN 978-1-317-45031-3.
- Matar, Ibrahim (Autumn 1981). "Israeli Settlements in the West Bank and Gaza Strip". Journal of Palestine Studies. 11 (1): 93–110. doi:10.2307/2536048. JSTOR 2536048.
- McKernan, Bethan (29 June 2022). "Israel delays travel restrictions on West Bank in apparent gesture to Joe Biden". The Guardian. Archived from the original on 8 April 2023.
- Mearsheimer, John; Walt, Stephen (March 2006). "The Israel Lobby". London Review of Books. Vol. 28, no. 6. pp. 3–12. Archived from the original on 5 October 2019.
- Mearsheimer, John; Walt, Stephen (2007). The Israel Lobby and US Foreign Aid. Penguin Books. ISBN 978-0-141-92066-5. Archived from the original on 5 February 2024.
- Melzer, Nils (2008). Targeted Killing in International Law. Oxford University Press. ISBN 978-0-199-53316-9.
- Mendel, Yonatan (6 March 2008). "Diary". London Review of Books. Vol. 30, no. 5. pp. 30–31. Archived from the original on 27 November 2019.
- Meneley, Anne (June 2011). "Blood, Sweat and Tears in a Bottle of Palestinian Extra-Virgin Olive Oil". Food, Culture & Society. 14 (2): 275–292. doi:10.2752/175174411X12893984828872. S2CID 155491784 – via ResearchGate.
- Michaeli, Sarit (January 2013). Crowd Control: Israel's Use of Crowd Control Weapons in the West Bank (PDF). B'Tselem. Archived (PDF) from the original on 8 January 2023.
- Mintz, Alex (1983). "The military-industrial complex: The Israeli case". Journal of Strategic Studies. 6 (3): 623–639. doi:10.1080/01402398308437160. JSTOR 174246.
- Morris, Benny (1993). Israel's Border Wars, 1949–1956. Oxford University Press. ISBN 978-0-19-829262-3.
- Müller, Margret (2017). The World According To Israeli Newspapers: Representations of International Involvement in the Israeli-Palestinian Conflict. Frank & Timme. ISBN 978-3-732-90286-6.
- Musaee, Anwar H. M; Abbas, Eeman Muhammad; Mujan, Wan Kamal; Sidik, Roziah (2014). "Waqf Land in the West Bank and Investment Current State of Affairs". Asian Social Science. 10 (14): 23–39. doi:10.5539/ass.v10n14p23. Archived from the original on 7 March 2024 – via ResearchGate.
- Nicoletti, Claudia; Hearne, Anne-Maria (2012). Pillage of the Dead Sea: Israel's Unlawful Exploitation of Natural Resources in the Occupied Palestinian Territories. Al-Haq. ISBN 978-9-950-32734-4. Archived from the original on 31 January 2020.
- Niksic, Orhan; Eddin, Nur Nasser; Cali, Massimiliano (2014). Area C and the Future of the Palestinian Economy. World Bank Publications. ISBN 978-1-464-80196-9. Archived from the original on 3 March 2023.
- "No shelter for the 25 residents, including 15 children, of Khirbet 'Ein Karzaliyah". B'Tselem. 12 February 2014. Archived from the original on 30 January 2019.
- Norton, Tom (27 November 2023). "Israel Organ Harvesting Allegations Explained". Newsweek. Archived from the original on 14 February 2024.
- Nusseibeh, Sari (2015). Once Upon a Country: A Palestinian Life. Farrar, Straus and Giroux. ISBN 978-1-250-09875-7. Archived from the original on 7 March 2024.
- "The Occupation of Water". Amnesty International. November 2017. Archived from the original on 6 April 2023.
- "Occupation, Inc. How Settlement Businesses Contribute to Israel's Violations of Palestinian Rights". Human Rights Watch. 19 January 2016. Archived from the original on 17 June 2016.
- O'Malley, Padraig (2015). The Two-State Delusion: Israel and Palestine—A Tale of Two Narratives. Penguin Books. ISBN 978-0-698-19218-8. Archived from the original on 7 March 2024.
- "Operation Patient: The Hidden Story of the Initiative to Deport Palestinian Prisoners to Jordan". Akevot Institute for Israeli-Palestinian Conflict Research. 27 July 2021. Archived from the original on 24 March 2023.
- Opportunities and Challenges of Palestinian Development actions in Area C (PDF) (Report). ARIJ. 2016. Archived from the original (PDF) on 1 September 2020.
- Overview of Israel's Demolition Policy (PDF). Israeli Committee Against House Demolitions. December 2017. Archived from the original (PDF) on 22 August 2020.
- Pacchiani, Gianluca (1 November 2023). "IDF soldiers film themselves abusing, humiliating West Bank Palestinians". The Times of Israel. Archived from the original on 20 November 2023.
- "Palestinian minors killed by Israeli security forces in the West Bank, since Operation Cast Lead". B'Tselem. 2018b. Archived from the original on 26 August 2017.
- Pappe, Ilan (2017). The Biggest Prison on Earth: A History of the Occupied Territories. Oneworld Publications. ISBN 978-1-780-74433-9. Archived from the original on 3 March 2023.
- Parker, Richard B. (Spring 1992). "The June 1967 War: Some Mysteries Explored". Middle East Journal. 46 (2): 177–197. JSTOR 4328429.
- Pedahzur, Ami; Perliger, Arie (2009). Jewish Terrorism in Israel. Columbia University Press. p. 73. ISBN 978-0-231-15446-8 – via Internet Archive.
- Peled, Yoav (2006). "From Zionism to Capitalism: The Political Economy of the Neoliberal Warfare State". In Beinin, Joel; Stein, Rebecca L. (eds.). The Struggle for Sovereignty: Palestine and Israel, 1993-2005. Stanford University Press. pp. 38–53. ISBN 978-0-8047-5365-4. Archived from the original on 7 March 2024.
- Peleg, Ilan (1995). Human Rights in the West Bank and Gaza: Legacy and Politics. Syracuse University Press. p. 162. ISBN 978-0-815-62682-4 – via Internet Archive.
- Pelleg-Sryck, Tamar (2011). "The Mysteries of Administrative Detention". In Baker, Abeer; Matar, Anat (eds.). Threat: Palestinian Political Prisoners in Israel. Pluto Press. pp. 123–135. ISBN 978-0-745-33021-1.
- Penslar, Derek (2007). Israel in History: The Jewish State in Comparative Perspective. Routledge. ISBN 978-1-134-14669-7. Archived from the original on 7 March 2024.
- Peri, Yoram (2006). Generals in the Cabinet Room: How the Military Shapes Israeli Policy. United States Institute of Peace Press. ISBN 978-1-929-22381-7. Archived from the original on 7 March 2024.
- Peteet, Julie (February 1994). "Male Gender and Rituals of Resistance in the Palestinian "Intifada": A Cultural Politics of Violence". American Ethnologist. 21 (1): 31–49. doi:10.1525/ae.1994.21.1.02a00020. JSTOR 646520.
- Peteet, Julie (May 1996). "The Writing on the Walls: The Graffiti of the Intifada". Cultural Anthropology. 11 (2): 139–159. doi:10.1525/can.1996.11.2.02a00010. JSTOR 656446. S2CID 143605458.
- Peteet, Julie (Winter 2016). "The Work of Comparison: Israel/Palestine and Apartheid". Anthropological Quarterly. 89 (1): 247–281. doi:10.1353/anq.2016.0015. JSTOR 43955521. S2CID 147128703.
- Peters, Joel (2012). "Israel". In Peters, Joel (ed.). The European Union and the Arab Spring: Promoting Democracy and Human Rights in the Middle East. Lexington Books. pp. 77–92. ISBN 978-0-739-17444-9. Archived from the original on 7 March 2024.
- Pieterse, Jan (1984). "State Terrorism on a Global Scale: The Role of Israel". Crime and Social Justice. 21–22 (4): 58–80. JSTOR 297662307.
- Plaw, Avery (2016). Targeting Terrorists: A License to Kill?. Routledge. ISBN 978-1-317-04671-4.
- Playfair, Emma (Fall 1988). "Israel's Security Needs in the West Bank, Real and Contrived". Arab Studies Quarterly. 10 (4): 406–423. JSTOR 41857980.
- "PM: IDF to keep operating in West Bank areas under full PA control". The Times of Israel. 21 April 2016. Archived from the original on 18 July 2017.
- Pollock, David (8 July 2022). "New Poll Reveals Moderate Trend Among East Jerusalem Palestinians". The Washington Institute for Nar East Policy. WINEP. Archived from the original on 13 July 2022.
- Poole, Steven (2007). Unspeak: How Words Become Weapons, How Weapons Become a Message, and How That Message Becomes Reality. Grove Atlantic. ISBN 978-1-555-84872-9.
- Popp, Roland (Spring 2006). "Stumbling Decidedly into the Six-Day War". Middle East Journal. 60 (2): 281–309. doi:10.3751/194034606783996500. JSTOR 4330250.
- Punamäki, Raija-Leena (Summer 1988). "Experiences of Torture, Means of Coping, and Level of Symptoms among PalestinianPolitical Prisoners". Journal of Palestine Studies. 17 (4): 81–96. doi:10.2307/2537292. JSTOR 2537292.
- Quigley, John B. (2005). The Case for Palestine: An International Law Perspective. Duke University Press. ISBN 978-0-822-33539-9.
- Quigley, John B. (2009). "Palestine: The Issue of Statehood". In Silverburg, Sanford R. (ed.). Palestine and International Law: Essays on Politics and Economics. Jefferson, NC and London: McFarland & Company. pp. 37–43. ISBN 978-0-786-44248-5.
- Quigley, John B. (2018). The Economic Costs of the Israeli Occupation for the Palestinian People and Their Human Right to Development (PDF). UNCTAD. Archived (PDF) from the original on 4 July 2019.
- Rahmeh, Abdullah Abu (26 February 2015). "A Decade of Civil Disobedience in My West Bank Village". Haaretz. Archived from the original on 3 December 2019.
- "Ralph Wilde". UCL Faculty of Laws. University College London. 11 September 2017. Archived from the original on 16 March 2022.
- Rathbun, Brian C. (2014). Diplomacy's Value: Creating Security in 1920s Europe and the Contemporary Middle East. Cornell University Press. p. 205. ISBN 978-0-801-45505-6 – via Internet Archive.
- Raz, Adam (3 June 2021a). "Israel Claimed Its 1967 Land Conquests Weren't Planned. Declassified Documents Reveal Otherwise". Haaretz. Archived from the original on 8 December 2021.
- Raz, Adam (16 September 2021b). "When the Shin Bet Chief Warned That Educated Arabs Are a 'Problem' for Israel". Haaretz. Archived from the original on 18 December 2021.
- Rechnitzer, Haim O. (Fall 2008). "Redemptive Theology in the Thought of Yeshayahu Leibowitz". Israel Studies. 13 (3): 137–159. doi:10.2979/ISR.2008.13.3.137. JSTOR 30245835. S2CID 145216120.
- Reinhart, Tanya (2011). Israel/Palestine: How to End the War of 1948 (2nd ed.). Seven Stories Press. ISBN 978-1-609-80122-9. Archived from the original on 7 March 2024.
- Report of the Independent International Commission of Inquiry on the Occupied Palestinian Territory, including East Jerusalem, and Israel (PDF) (Report). OHCHR. 14 September 2022. Archived (PDF) from the original on 11 January 2024.
- Report of the United Nations Fact Finding Mission on the Gaza Conflict (Advance Edited Version) (PDF) (Report). United Nations Human Rights Council. 15 September 2009. Archived (PDF) from the original on 7 October 2009.
- "Restrictions on Movement". B'Tselem. 11 November 2017b. Archived from the original on 5 June 2011.
- Reuveny, Rafael (Winter 2008). "The Last Colonialist: Israel in the Occupied Territories since 1967" (PDF). The Independent Review. 12 (3): 325–374. Archived (PDF) from the original on 1 June 2023.
- Richman, Jackson (24 May 2018). "More than 60 organizations plead with colleges to protect Jewish students' civil rights". Washington Examiner. Archived from the original on 21 April 2019.
- "Rights experts call for probe into alleged violations against Palestinian women and girls". United Nations News. United Nations Department of Global Communications. 19 February 2024. Archived from the original on 19 February 2024.
- Rivlin, Paul (2010). The Israeli Economy from the Foundation of the State through the 21st Century. Cambridge University Press. ISBN 978-1-139-49396-3. Archived from the original on 7 March 2024.
- Roberson, Mary (2013). "Birth, Transformation, and Death of Refugee Identity: Women and Girls of the Intifida". In Cole, Ellen; Rothblum, Esther; Espin, Oliva (eds.). Refugee Women and Their Mental Health: Shattered Societies, Shattered Lives. Taylor & Francis. ISBN 978-1-135-83760-0.
- Roberts, Adam (January 1990). "Prolonged Military Occupation: The Israeli-Occupied Territories Since 1967". The American Journal of International Law. 84 (1): 44–103. doi:10.2307/2203016. JSTOR 2203016. S2CID 145514740.
- Robertson, Nick (19 February 2024). "UN experts condemn 'credible' reports of executions, sexual assault by Israeli soldiers". The Hill. Archived from the original on 26 February 2024.
- Rodinson, Maxime (2002) [First published 1973]. Israel, a Colonial-settler State? (PDF). Monad Press. ISBN 978-0-873-48866-2.
- Ron, James (1994). Torture and Ill-treatment: Israel's Interrogation of Palestinians from the Occupied Territories. Human Rights Watch. ISBN 978-1-564-32136-7. Archived from the original on 7 March 2024.
- Ross, Dennis; Makovsky, David (2009). Myths, Illusions, and Peace: Finding a New Direction for America in the Middle East. Penguin. ISBN 978-1-101-08187-7. Archived from the original on 7 March 2024. "Israel could not be expected to withdraw its forces until someone could demonstrate they were willing and able to ensure that the West Bank would not be a launching pad for attacks against Israel."
- Roth, Richard; El Damanhy, Kareem; Greene, Richard Allen (20 February 2024). "UN experts demand investigation into claims Israeli forces killed, raped and sexually assaulted Palestinian women and girls". CNN. Archived from the original on 20 February 2024.
- "A Routine Founded on Violence". B'Tselem. 11 November 2017a. Archived from the original on 24 October 2019.
- Roy, Sara (Winter 2010). "Reflections on the Israeli-Palestinian Conflict in U.S. Public Discourse: Legitimizing Dissent". Journal of Palestine Studies. 39 (2): 23–38. doi:10.1525/jps.2010.xxxix.2.23. JSTOR 10.1525/jps.2010.xxxix.2.23.
- Rubenberg, Cheryl (2003). The Palestinians: In Search of a Just Peace. Lynne Rienner Publishers. p. 124. ISBN 978-1-588-26225-7 – via Internet Archive.
- "The Rules of War and Human Rights in the Israel-Hamas War". Johns Hopkins Bloomberg School of Public Health. Anadolu Agency. 27 October 2023. Archived from the original on 15 October 2023.
- Said, Edward W. (Summer 1991). "Reflections on Twenty Years of Palestinian History". Journal of Palestine Studies. 20 (4): 5–22. doi:10.2307/2537432. JSTOR 2537432.
- Sait, M. Siraj (Spring 2004). "Have Palestinian Children Forfeited Their Rights?". Journal of Comparative Family Studies. 35 (2): 211–228. doi:10.3138/jcfs.35.2.211. JSTOR 41603933.
- Samman, Maha (2013). Trans-Colonial Urban Space in Palestine: Politics and Development. Routledge. ISBN 978-1-136-66885-2. Archived from the original on 7 March 2024.
- Sayed, Hani (2014). "The Fictions of the Illegal Occupation in the West Bank and Gaza". Oregon Review of International Law. 16: 79. Archived from the original on 6 September 2023.
- Schnell, Izhak; Mishal, Shaul (April 2008). "Place as a Source of Identity in Colonizing Societies: Israeli Settlements in Gaza". Geographical Review. 98 (2): 242–259. Bibcode:2008GeoRv..98..242S. doi:10.1111/j.1931-0846.2008.tb00298.x. JSTOR 30034230. S2CID 154996074.
- Selby, Jan (2003b). Water, Power and Politics in the Middle East: The Other Israel-Palestine Conflict. I.B.Tauris. ISBN 978-1-860-64934-9. Archived from the original on 7 March 2024.
- "Separate and Unequal: Israel's Discriminatory Treatment of Palestinians in the Occupied Palestinian Territories" (PDF). Human Rights Watch. December 2010. Archived (PDF) from the original on 8 August 2019.
- Shafir, Gershon (November 1984). "Changing Nationalism and Israel's "Open Frontier" on the West Bank". Theory & Society. 13 (6): 803–827. doi:10.1007/BF00209214. JSTOR 657140. S2CID 144216444.
- Shafir, Gershon (2017). A Half Century of Occupation: Israel, Palestine, and the World's Most Intractable Conflict. University of California Press. ISBN 978-0-520-29350-2. Archived from the original on 7 March 2024.
- Shahak, Israel (Autumn 1974). "Ethos of Conflict of the Palestinian Society". Journal of Palestine Studies. 4 (1): 181–186. doi:10.2307/2535945. JSTOR 2535945.
- Shaked, Ronni (2016). "Ethos of Conflict of the Palestinian Society". In Sharvit, Keren; Halperin, Eran (eds.). A Social Psychology Perspective on The Israeli-Palestinian Conflict: Celebrating the Legacy of Daniel Bar-Tal. Vol. 2. Springer Publishing. pp. 133–149. ISBN 978-3-319-24841-7. Archived from the original on 7 March 2024.
- Shakir, Omar (27 April 2021). A Threshold Crossed: Israeli Authorities and the Crimes of Apartheid and Persecution (Report). Human Rights Watch. Archived from the original on 17 January 2023.
- Shalhoub-kevorkian, Nadera (January 2012). "E-Resistance and Technological In/Security in Everyday Life: The Palestinian Case". The British Journal of Criminology. 52 (1): 55–72. doi:10.1093/bjc/azr059. JSTOR 44173471.
- Sharkey, Heather J. (2003). Living with Colonialism: Nationalism and Culture in the Anglo-Egyptian Sudan. University of California Press. ISBN 978-0-520-23559-5. Archived from the original on 7 March 2024.
- Shauli, Avi (9 June 2007). "Cost of occupation – over $50 billion". Ynetnews. Archived from the original on 20 November 2019.
- Shehadeh, Raja (1985a). Occupier's law: Israel and the West Bank. Institute for Palestine Studies. ISBN 978-0-887-28149-5.
- Shehadeh, Raja (Spring–Summer 1985b). "Some Legal Aspects of Israeli Land Policy in the Occupied Territories". Arab Studies Quarterly. 7 (2–3): 42–61. JSTOR 41857768.
- Shehadeh, Raja (17 September 2020). "Occupying Palestine is rotting Israel from inside. No Gulf peace deal can hide that". The Guardian. Archived from the original on 17 May 2023.
- Sher, Gilead (2006). The Israeli–Palestinian Peace Negotiations, 1999–2001: Within Reach. Routledge. ISBN 978-0-714-68542-7. Archived from the original on 7 March 2024.
- Sherwood, Harriet (5 December 2013). "Israeli former security chief: failure to end conflict is bigger threat than Iran". The Guardian. Archived from the original on 18 September 2019.
- Shezaf, Hagar (23 June 2020). "When an Archaeological 'Find' Can Evict Palestinians From Their Home". Haaretz. Archived from the original on 29 October 2021.
- Shezaf, Hagar (8 July 2021). "Palestinians Claiming Land at Illegal Outpost Take Israel's Deal With Settlers to Court". Haaretz. Archived from the original on 21 May 2022.
- Shezaf, Hagar; Kubovich, Yaniv (26 August 2020). "Israeli Soldiers Placed Explosives in West Bank Village for 'Deterrence'". Haaretz. Archived from the original on 26 April 2022.
- Shinn, Chris (November 2012). "Teacher Education Reform in Palestine: Policy Challenges amid Donor Expectations". Comparative Education Review. 56 (4): 608–633. doi:10.1086/667434. JSTOR 10.1086/667434. S2CID 144932152.
- Shlaim, Avi (2012). "Poor Little Samson". In Shlaim, Avi; Louis, Wm Roger (eds.). The 1967 Arab-Israeli War: Origins and Consequences. Cambridge University Press. pp. 22–54. ISBN 978-1-107-00236-4. Archived from the original on 7 March 2024.
- Shlaim, Avi (2015). "Israeli Interference in Internal Arab Politics: The Case of Lebanon". In Luciani, Giacomo; Salamé, Ghassan (eds.). The Politics of Arab Integration. Routledge. pp. 232–254. ISBN 978-1-317-41119-2. Archived from the original on 7 March 2024.
- Shulman, David D. (2007). Dark Hope: Working for Peace in Israel and Palestine. University of Chicago Press. ISBN 978-1-459-62712-3. Archived from the original on 7 March 2024.
- Shulman, David D. (2018). Freedom and Despair: Notes from the South Hebron Hills. University of Chicago Press. ISBN 978-0-226-56665-8. Archived from the original on 7 March 2024.
- Simpson, Gerald (2001). Detainees Denied Justice. Kuwser Law International. ISBN 978-9-041-11552-2.
- Slater, Jerome (1994). "The Significance of Israeli Historical Revisionism". In Stone, Russell; Zenner, Walter P. (eds.). Essays on Israeli Social Issues and Scholarship. Vol. 3. SUNY Press. pp. 179–199. ISBN 978-1-438-42140-7.
- Slater, Jerome (2020). Mythologies without End: The US, Israel, and the Arab-Israeli Conflict, 1917-2020. Oxford University Press. ISBN 978-0-190-45909-3.
- Slyomovics, Susan (Summer 1991). ""To Put One's Fingers in the Bleeding Wound": Palestinian Theatre under Israeli Censorship". The Drama Review. 35 (2): 18–38. doi:10.2307/1146087. JSTOR 1146087.
- "Special Rapporteur Says Israel's Unlawful Carceral Practices in the Occupied Palestinian Territory Are Tantamount to International Crimes and Have Turned it into an Open-Air Prison". OHCHR. 10 July 2023. Archived from the original on 11 July 2023.
- "Statistics on demolition of houses built without permits in the West Bank (Not including East Jerusalem)". B'Tselem. September 2018a. Archived from the original on 26 October 2019.
- Stein, Kenneth W. (2017a). The Land Question in Palestine, 1917–1939. University of North Carolina Press. ISBN 978-1-469-61725-1.
- Stein, Yael (March 2018). Minors in Jeopardy: Violation of the Rights of Palestinian Minors by Israel's Military Courts (PDF). B'Tselem. ISBN 978-965-7613-33-7. Archived (PDF) from the original on 23 October 2018.
- Stockton, Ronald R. (Summer 1990). "Intifada Deaths". Journal of Palestine Studies. 19 (4): 86–95. doi:10.2307/2537390. JSTOR 2537390.
- "A Survey of Israeli Settlements". MERIP Reports (60): 13–20. September 1977. doi:10.2307/3011548. JSTOR 3011548.
- Swirski, Shlomo (2010). The Burden of the Israeli–Palestinian Conflict: 2010 Report (PDF) (Report). Adva Center. Archived (PDF) from the original on 10 January 2024.
- Tawil-Souri, Helga (Winter 2016). "Surveillance Sublime: The Security State in Jerusalem". Jerusalem Quarterly. 68. Institute for Palestine Studies: 56–65. doi:10.70190/jq.I68.p56.
- Tessler, Mark A. (1994). A History of the Israeli-Palestinian Conflict. Indiana University Press. p. 553. ISBN 978-0-253-20873-6 – via Internet Archive.
- Thabat, Abdel Azis Mousa; Abdulla, Taisir; Elhelou, Mohammed-Wafaei; Vostanis, Panos (2006). "Effect of trauma on Palestinian Children's Mental Health in the Gazsa Strip and the West". In Greenbaum, Charles W.; Veerman, Philip E.; Bacon-Shnoor, Naomi (eds.). Protection of Children During Armed Political Conflict: A Multidisciplinary Perspective. Intersentia. pp. 123–141. ISBN 978-9-050-95341-2.
- "Third Committee Spotlights Human Rights Abuses in Conflicts, Stressing Need to End Terrorist Attacks, Genocide, Illegal Hostage-Taking, Enforced Displacement" (Press release). United Nations. 17 October 2023. Archived from the original on 9 January 2024.
- Thrall, Nathan (2017). The Only Language They Understand: Forcing Compromise in Israel and Palestine. Henry Holt and Company. ISBN 978-1-627-79710-8.
- Tillman, Seth (Winter 1978). "The West Bank Hearings: Israel's Colonization of Occupied Territory". Journal of Palestine Studies. 7 (2): 71–87. doi:10.2307/2536439. JSTOR 2536439.
- Tiripelli, Giuliana (2016). Media and Peace in the Middle East: The Role of Journalism in Israel-Palestine. PalgraveMacmillan. ISBN 978-1-137-50401-2.
- Torture and Intimidation in the West Bank: The Case of Al-Fara'a Prison (Report). Law in the Service of Man. 1986. Archived from the original on 25 July 2019.
- Toynbee, Arnold (January 1931). "The Present Situation in Palestine". International Affairs. 10 (1): 38–68. doi:10.2307/3015929. JSTOR 3015929.
- Tuma, Elias H.; Darin-Drabkin, Haim (1978). The Economic Case for Palestine. Croom Helm.
- "UN experts appalled by reported human rights violations against Palestinian women and girls". Office of the High Commissioner for Human Rights (Press release). Geneva: United Nations. 19 February 2024. Archived from the original on 21 February 2024.
- "UN experts warn of Israeli violations against Palestinian women, girls". Al Jazeera. 19 February 2024. Archived from the original on 19 February 2024.
- "UN rights office 'seriously concerned' about Israel's increased arrest of Palestinians". Reuters. 1 December 2023. Archived from the original on 2 December 2023.
- Unctad (Summer 2013). "Communal Impoverishment in Jerusalem" (PDF). Jerusalem Quarterly (54). Institute for Palestine Studies: 93–111. Archived (PDF) from the original on 29 March 2015.
- Unctad (September 2015b). The Besieged Palestinian Agricultural Sector (PDF). UNCTAD. Archived (PDF) from the original on 28 August 2020.
- Unctad (21 July 2016). Economic Costs of the Israeli occupation for the Palestinian people (PDF). UNCTAD. Archived (PDF) from the original on 16 May 2017.
- Unispal (1 September 2007). Israeli-Palestinian Fatalities Since 2000 – Key Trends. UNISPAL. Archived from the original on 17 February 2019.
- "Urgent Action: Administrative Detention Renewed" (PDF). Amnesty International. 2018a. Archived (PDF) from the original on 2 March 2020.
- Van Arkadie, Brian (Winter 1977). "The Impact of the Israeli Occupation on the Economies of the West Bank and Gaza". Journal of Palestine Studies. 6 (2): 103–129. doi:10.2307/2535505. JSTOR 2535505.
- Van Reenen, Piet (2006). "Children as Victims in the Israeli Palestinian Conflict: Policing Realities and Police Training". In Greenbaum, Charles W.; Veerman, Philip E.; Bacon-Shnoor, Naomi (eds.). Protection of Children During Armed Political Conflict: A Multidisciplinary Perspective. Intersentia. pp. 371–393. ISBN 978-9-050-95341-2.
- Veracini, Lorenzo (Winter 2013). "The Other Shift: Settler Colonialism, Israel, and the Occupation". Journal of Palestine Studies. 42 (2): 26–42. doi:10.1525/jps.2013.42.2.26. hdl:1959.3/316461. JSTOR 10.1525/jps.2013.42.2.26.
- Weill, Sharon (2007). "The judicial arm of the occupation: the Israeli military courts in the occupied territories". International Review of the Red Cross. 89 (866): 395–418. doi:10.1017/s1816383107001142. ISSN 1816-3831. S2CID 55988443.
- Weill, Sharon (2014). The Role of National Courts in Applying International Humanitarian Law. Oxford University Press. ISBN 978-0-19-968542-4.
- Weinthal, Erika; Sowers, Jeannie (1 March 2019). "Targeting infrastructure and livelihoods in the West Bank and Gaza". International Affairs. 95 (2): 319–340. doi:10.1093/ia/iiz015.
- Weir, Alison (26 November 2009). "Israeli Organ Harvesting: From Moldova To Palestine". WRMEA. Archived from the original on 15 February 2024.
- Weizman, Eyal (2012). Hollow Land: Israel's Architecture of Occupation. Verso Books. ISBN 978-1-844-67915-7. Archived from the original on 3 March 2023.
- "Why are so many Palestinian prisoners in Israeli jails?". Al Jazeera. 8 October 2023. Archived from the original on 8 October 2023.
- Wilde, Ralph (2021). "Using the Master's Tools to Dismantle the Master's House: International Law and Palestinian Liberation". The Palestine Yearbook of International Law Online. 22 (1): 1–74. doi:10.1163/22116141_022010_002. S2CID 245698763.
- World Bank (22 September 2008). Palestinian Economic Prospects: Aid, Access and Reform (PDF). World Bank. Archived (PDF) from the original on 3 March 2016.
- World Bank (April 2009). Assessment of Restrictions on Palestinian Water Sector Development (PDF). World Bank. Archived (PDF) from the original on 13 December 2023 – via UNISPAL.
- World Bank (2 October 2013). Area C and the Future of the Palestinian Economy (PDF). World Bank. Archived (PDF) from the original on 1 August 2014.
- World Bank (2 January 2016). The Telecommunication Sector in the Palestinian Territories: A Missed Opportunity for Economic Development (PDF). World Bank. Archived (PDF) from the original on 31 May 2019.
- Yahya, Adel H (2010). "Heritage Appropriation in the Holy Land". In Boytner, Ran; Dodd, Lynn Swartz; Parker, Bradley J. (eds.). Controlling the Past, Owning the Future: The Political Uses of Archaeology in the Middle East. University of Arizona Press. pp. 142–158. ISBN 978-0-816-52795-3. Archived from the original on 3 March 2023.
- Yiftachel, Oren (2006). Ethnocracy: Land and Identity Politics in Israel/Palestine. University of Pennsylvania Press. ISBN 978-0-812-23927-0. Archived from the original on 7 March 2024.
- Ziai, Fatemeh (2013). "Human rights violations as an obstacle to economic development: restrictions on movement in the West Bank and the Gaza Strip". In Wright, J.W. Jr (ed.). The Political Economy of Middle East Peace: The Impact of Competing Trade Agendas. Routledge. pp. 128–152. ISBN 978-1-134-69013-8. Archived from the original on 5 February 2024.
- Zureik, Elia (November 2001). "Constructing Palestine through Surveillance Practices". British Journal of Middle Eastern Studies. 28 (2): 205–227. doi:10.1080/13530190120083086. JSTOR 826125. S2CID 143506922.
- Zureik, Elia (2010). "Colonialism, surveillance, and population control: Israel/Palestine". In Zureik, Elia; Lyon, David; Abu-Laban, Yasmeen (eds.). Surveillance and Control in Israel/Palestine: Population, Territory and Power. Routledge. pp. 3–45. ISBN 978-1-136-93097-3. Archived from the original on 7 March 2024.
- Zureik, Elia (2015). Israel's Colonial Project in Palestine: Brutal Pursuit. Routledge. ISBN 978-1-317-34046-1. Archived from the original on 7 March 2024.
- "ت الاحتلال ينقل أسرى من سجن عوفر وهم عراة" [The occupation transports prisoners from Ofer prison while they are naked]. Ajeel (in Arabic). 14 November 2023. Archived from the original on 7 December 2023. (شبكة أجيال)-أظهر مقطع فيديو جنود الاحتلال وهم ينقلون أسرى من سجن عوفر إلى حافلة وهم عراة بدون ملابس. وتعرض الأسرى خلال نقلهم إلى الضرب والشتائم. [(Ajyal Network) – A video clip showed occupation soldiers transferring prisoners from Ofer prison to a bus while they were naked and without clothes. During their transfer, the prisoners were subjected to beatings and insults.]
- Al Shafei, Esra'a; Saleh, Falastine (8 April 2024). "Surveillance as a Service: The Global Impact of Israeli "Defense" Technologies on Privacy and Human Rights | Tor Project". Tor Project. "This pervasive surveillance technology doesn't end in Palestine, but it often starts with it."
- Goodfriend, Sophia (21 February 2022). "How the Occupation Fuels Tel Aviv's Booming AI Sector". Foreign Policy.
- Hempel, Jonathan (3 May 2022). "The watchful eye of Israel's surveillance empire". +972 Magazine.
- Loewenstein, Antony (30 October 2024). "Episode 3: Privatizing the Occupation". The Palestine Laboratory (Podcast). Drop Site News.
- Beaumont, Peter (12 September 2014). "Israeli intelligence veterans refuse to serve in Palestinian territories". The Guardian.
- Solon, Olivia (28 October 2019). "Why did Microsoft fund an Israeli firm that surveils West Bank Palestinians?". NBC News.
- Amnesty International (2 May 2023). "Israeli authorities are using facial recognition technology to entrench apartheid".
- Smith, Brad (25 September 2025). "Update on ongoing Microsoft review". Microsoft.com.
- Davies, Harry; Abraham, Yuval (6 August 2025). "'A million calls an hour': Israel relying on Microsoft cloud for expansive surveillance of Palestinians". The Guardian.
