= Israeli permit regime in the West Bank =

Regime of permits for Palestinian residents in the Israeli-occupied West Bank

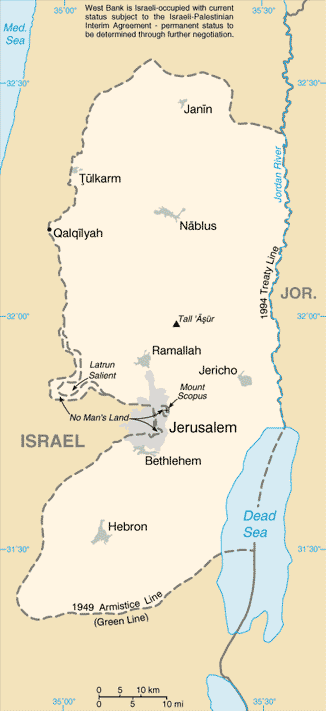
Map of the West Bank

The Israeli permit regime in the West Bank is the legal regime that requires Palestinians to obtain a number of separate permits from the Israeli military authorities governing Palestinians in the Israeli-occupied West Bank for a wide range of activities. (Note: "The most common permits are those allowing Palestinians to work in Israel, or in Jewish settlements in the West Bank. Over the decades, however, the permit regimen has grown into a vast, triple-digit bureaucracy." (Levinson 2011)) The first military order requiring permits for the Palestinians was issued before the end of the 1967 Six-Day War. The two uprisings of 1987 and 2001 were met by increased security measures, differentiation of IDs into green and red, policies of village closures, curfews and more stringent restrictions on Palestinian movement, with the general exit permit of 1972 replaced by individual permits. The stated Israeli justification for this new permit regime regarding movements was to contain the expansion of the uprisings and protect both the IDF and Israeli civilians from military confrontations with armed Palestinians. The regime has since expanded to 101 different types of permits covering nearly every aspect of Palestinian life, governing movement in Israel and in Israeli settlements, transit between Gaza and the West Bank, movement in Jerusalem and the seam zone, and travel abroad via international borders. The Israeli High Court has rejected petitions against the permit regime, allowing that it severely impinges on the rights of Palestinian residents but that the harm was proportionate.

== Definitions ==
According to Yael Berda of Jerusalem's Hebrew University, the Israeli permit regime is one of three elements underpinning Israel's military management of the occupied population through intelligence, economic control and racial profiling. Berda defines the "permit regime" as the "bureaucratic apparatus of the occupation modeled around that which developed in the West Bank between the signing of the Oslo Accords in 1993 through the early 2000s". Cheryl Rubenberg argued that the permit system was the most effective instrument in what other scholars have called Israel's techniques of "suspended violence". (Note: 'Israeli scholars Ariella Azoulay and Adir Ophir (2005) have characterized Israel's control over the West Bank as the interplay between "spectacular violence" that kills instantly and "suspended violence," meaning measures that are not immediately lethal, such as the permit system; the destruction of homes, roads, and well; restrictions on movement; denial of access to water resources; the system of Jewish-only bypass roads; the Separation Barrier; and other means of dividing Palestinian territory into separate parcels'."Of all the elements in Israel's suspended violence over the Palestinians, none is more all encompassing or more effective than the permit system." (Rubenberg 2019, pp. 234, 237ff.))

Neve Gordon of Ben-Gurion University of the Negev writes that the permit regime is both the "scaffolding for many other forms of control" while also forming a part of the "infrastructure of control" of the Israeli occupation. Aeyal Gross of Tel Aviv University defines the permit regime as "a legal regime relating to freedom of movement". He writes that the regime allows Israel to further control the lives of Palestinians in line with a goal of "frictionless control" that the IDF has pursued.

Ariella Azoulay and Adi Ophir write that the system itself serves as a link between the security services and the civil authorities as any permit approval requires the consent of security agents within administrative offices. They write that while permits themselves have a long history as a bureaucratic device, that the system "acquired a life and logic of its own in the Occupied Territories".

== History ==
The permit regime began to be implemented before the end of hostilities in the 1967 Six-Day War. Permits would be required for a wide range of activities, and Gordon states that as a whole "the permit regime operated to shape practically every aspect of Palestinian life". Within ten days of the end of the war a military order was issued that required a permit to conduct any business transaction that involved land or property. That same day an order was declared that required Palestinians to hold a permit to possess any foreign currency, with violations punishable by up to five years imprisonment. Permits would be required to install any water device, or to perform electrical work, including connecting a generator. In order to transport any plant or commodity in to or out of the Palestinian territories, a permit was required. Any form of transportation, including tractors and donkey carts, would require a permit to operate. Military order 101 issued 2 months into the occupation in that year criminalized any "procession, gathering, or rally" organized without first obtaining a permit from a military commander, A "rally" was defined as any assembly of ten or more persons that might address either a political matter or anything else that might be interpreted as having the purpose of "incitement". "Incitement" was defined as attempting to influence public opinion in a way that was liable to disturb public peace or order.

In 1968, Israel issued the "Entry to Israel Directive" which required all people entering Israel to possess a valid permit and gave authority for granting those permits to the regional military commander. This directive had no practical effect at the time as Israel had as a policy allowed travel between the newly occupied Palestinian territories of the Gaza Strip and the West Bank to and from Israel. In 1972, Israel issued general exit permits for all residents of the West Bank and the Gaza Strip to enter Israel and East Jerusalem between the hours of 5 AM and 1 AM, formalizing what had been an informal open-border policy between Israel and the Palestinian territories.

Until the First Intifada or "uprising" in 1987, over 100,000 Palestinians freely commuted into Israel on a daily basis, in cars with West Bank plates, without serious obstacles. Restrictions only applied to those convicted of security offenses. With the uprising, the Israeli army placed greater restrictions on Palestinian movement and imposed security measures such as curfews, closures and the marking of ID cards as either green for those denied entry into Israel, or red for the rest of the population. In 1991 during the Gulf War the general exit permit was revoked and replaced by a system of individual permits designed to "filter out Palestinian movement under [the] security pretext in Israel." The interim Oslo Accords left Israel with partial or full control over 83% of the West Bank and, according to Rashid Khalidi, concomitantly, Israel proceeded to tighten restrictions of what he calls its 'matrix of control, by developing a substantially new system, an intricate "web of procedures" including the "all-encompassing permit system", which suffocated Palestinian movement in the territories.

After the breakdown of negotiations at the 2000 Camp David Summit and the outbreak of the Second Intifada, the IDF imposed a total closure on the occupied territories and made the permit system more stringent in order to protect both its perceived security interests and civilians from armed confrontation with Palestinian militants. After initial attempts to repress the uprising failed, the Israeli West Bank barrier was constructed beyond the Green Line. This was accompanied by another increase in the types of access permits governing Palestinian movements. The system of permits, checkpoints and other measures did prove helpful in ending the Second Intifada, but some, even Israel commanders, argue that the frustrations caused by such restrictive policies could prove conducive to fostering the very terrorism they seek to put down. (Note: "Permits, deportations, closures, and other tools have successfully inhibited terrorists and helped crush the Second Intifada. But is Israel only making things worse in the long term? Palestinians believe Israeli security measures make more violence inevitable. Zuhair Kurdi, a Palestinian journalist commented, 'The legal father of the suicide bomber is the Israeli checkpoint, whilst his mother is the house demolition.' Twelve retired Israeli commanders similarly denounced the checkpoints and Ilan Paz, the former IDF administrator responsible for the occupation of the West Bank, contended that there is grave danger 'in having the Palestinian people with its back to the wall, not seeing a light at the end of the tunnel, unable to improve their economy, unable to move from place to place. This creates a reality that creates terror'." (Byman 2011, p. 168))

== Dimensions ==
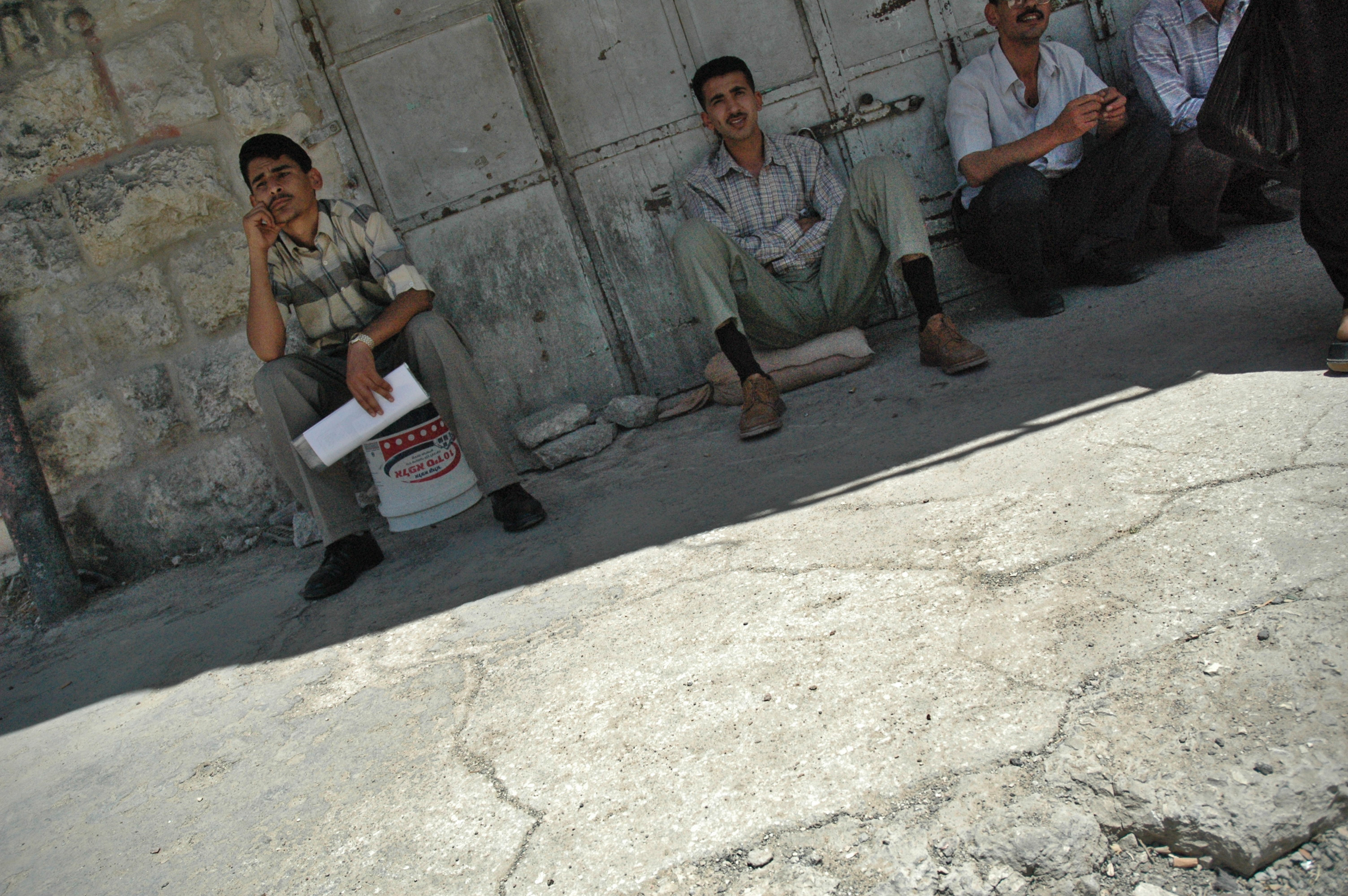
Detained Palestinians at checkpoint

Under Israeli military rule, nearly every aspect of everyday Palestinian life was subjected to pervasive military regulations, calculated to the number of 1,300 by 1996, from planting trees and importing books to house extensions. In the first two decades of occupation Palestinians were required to apply to the military authorities for permits and licenses for a number of things such as a driver's license, a telephone, trademark and birth registration, and a good conduct certificate which was indispensable to obtain entry into many branches of professions and to workplaces, with putative security considerations determining the decision, which was delivered by an oral communication. The vital source of information on security risks came from the Israeli Security Agency Shin Bet which was found to have been regularly misleading the courts for 16 years. Obtaining such permits has been described as a via dolorosa for the Palestinians seeking them. In 2004, only 0.14% of West Bankers (3,412 out of 2.3 million) had valid permits to travel through West Bank checkpoints, while throughout the whole of 2004 only 2.45% of West Bank inhabitants held any kind of permit at all. Military order 101 denied West Bankers the right to purchase from abroad (including from Israel) any form of printed matter such as books, posters, photographs, and even paintings unless prior authorization had been obtained from the military. Prohibitions also affected dress codes by disallowing certain colour combinations in clothing or refusing to cover the sewage in the Negev detention centre of Ansar 111 where a significant numbers of Palestinians have served time.

According to the Israel NGO HaMoked, any tourist from around the world or any Israeli can travel through the Seam Zone but access is forbidden to local Palestinians (roughly 50.000 Palestinians in 38 localities, according to 2012 figures) unless they manage to obtain from the Israeli military authorities any one of 13 permits, depending on their needs. These are classified as follows:

- a permanent resident certificate
- a permanent farmer permit
- a temporary farmer permit
- a business permit
- an employment permit
- a personal needs permit
- an education worker permit
- an international organization employee permit
- a Palestinian Authority employee permit
- an infrastructure worker permit
- a medical personnel permit
- a student permit
- a minor child permit.

Each type of permit has special requisites, and they are all temporary. Technically, a permit of this kind may cover two years, but most have to be renewed every three months.

Medical treatment in Israel or Palestinian hospitals in East Jerusalem involves obtaining three different permits, depending on whether the person is a patient, an escort, a doctor, or visitors to the hospitalized patient. On the occasion of funerals and weddings, first- or second-degree relatives in the West Bank and Gaza are allowed to apply for the necessary travel permits. Palestinian children require a special permit to attend school in East Jerusalem. A special permit is required if a Palestinian is employed in churches in Israel. In 2016 of 291 Gazan Palestinians requesting a permit to travel on the occasion of a death in the family/clan, permission was accorded to 105, and rejected for 68, while the remaining cases were pending. Of 803 seeking a permit to attend a conference, 84 were given a permit, and 133 refused. Of 148 petitions by Gaza Christians to visit holy sites outside the Strip, none were given, and none rejected. In all cases, the petition was left pending.

== Obtaining permits ==
Since 1991 Israel has never publicly clarified with clear consistent rules the criteria governing permits. To obtain a permit in the 1980s and 1990s, applicants were obligated to obtain an approval stamp from several separate offices, each time paying a fee. Comprehensive permit forms: from the tax office, the local police, the municipality, the Israeli-sponsored "village leagues" (both of the latter often staffed by collaborators) and the Israeli Security Agency Shin Bet did not guarantee the approval. (Note: "To give an example of the arbitrary nature of the exercise, a university teacher who wanted to attend a conference in the U.S. in May 1989 succeeded, at considerable financial cost, in obtaining all the necessary stamps and then appeared before the permit official of the Civil Administration. The latter summarily tore up the application form with all the hard won stamps once he found out that the applicant was a lecturer at the local university." (Hiltermann 1990, p. 88))

The lives of nearly all of the 4.5 million Palestinians in the Palestinian lands under Israel control are nearly all affected, directly or indirectly by the permit regime. The multiplicity of permit types and the legal complexities of qualifying to obtain them have created a sprawling bureaucracy, replete with brokers, and arguably feeds corruption, since as much as 25% of the wages earned by many Palestinian labourers with permission to work in Israel can be required to pay off permit brokers who, in turn, are thought to share their dividends with Israeli employers in a kind of kickback arrangement.

The Shin Bet maintains a list of Palestinians barred from entering Israel. Before the Second Intifada that list numbered only several thousand, and in the six years that followed it expanded to include almost 250,000 West Bank Palestinians. By 2007 approximately one fifth of the Palestinian male population between the ages of sixteen and sixty-five in the West Bank were classified as "security threats", resulting in their being barred movement permits. The Shin Bet also uses the regular renewal process to recruit Palestinian collaborators, and while the proportion of Palestinians accepting is low the suspicion of collaboration falls on all those who obtain entry permits, with Yael Berda remarking that "The result is the dissolution of the social fabric, due to the constant suspicion."

Permits to work in Israel can be revoked if a relative of the labourer is killed as a result of errant Israeli gunfire. When press photographer Amjad al-Alaami of Beit Ummar was shot in the head while standing in his doorway in March 2002, his brother Muayyad was denied a permit to work in Israel because Shin Beit considered him a security risk. The ban was rescinded after a decade and a half, and Muayyad al-Alaami resumed work as a tarrer for a Tel Aviv contractor. On 28 July 2021, as the family were driving to a picnic, one of 4 Israeli soldiers, interpreting a reverse by the car as suspicious, sprayed the family backup with two machine gun bursts, and killed one of Muayyad's three children, Mohammad (11) in the vehicle. Soon after, his work permit was revoked since, as the father of a victim of the conflict, he was again deemed a security risk.

=== Birth certificate ===
One Bethlehemite, trying to get his daughter's birth registered, as Palestinian birth registries are controlled by Israel, was required to obtain seven stamps from seven different government offices. The income office denied him their stamp because he was behind in his tax payments, though they were deducted automatically from his pay. His wife, using her identity papers, had to do the same rounds, and eventually, a birth certificate was conceded. Even when some powers were delegated to the Palestinian Authority, the appropriate Palestinian offices were reduced to acting as "mailmen", passing on requests for permits to the Israeli Civil Administration, 70-80% of which are then rejected on unexplained "security grounds".

=== Work permits ===
Before the First Intifada, nearly 70,000 Palestinians were registered as working in Israel. Additionally unregistered workers were estimated to increase the total number of Palestinian workers in Israel by 30-70%. Israel had always formally required a work permit for Palestinians to work within Israel, though before the First Intifada that requirement was widely unenforced and the Palestinians that did apply for a permit were approved nearly automatically. Two new forms of control were instituted by Israel during the Intifida, the entry permit regime, in 1988, and, in 1991, closures that restricted any Palestinian from leaving the West Bank or the Gaza Strip for some period of time. In 1988 Israel introduced a new green identity card that, as opposed to the old red or orange ones, barred holders from entering Israel. These identification cards were given to people who had been previously arrested, were active members of a political party, or had a record with the Shin Bet for another reason. The following year magnetic cards were issued to Palestinian workers from the Gaza Strip that contained "security background", including such things as the status of their electricity and water bills. Any derogatory data would result in the worker being denied entry.

Work was transformed from a right to a privilege that could be revoked at any time, and as a result many Palestinians restricted themselves from participating in political activities for fear of jeopardizing their families livelihoods. Applicants for work permits at the Israeli Civil Administration would often be interviewed by the Shin Bet and asked to collaborate in exchange for being granted a permit, with the workers dependency on Israel for wages being crucial to hundreds to thousands of residents becoming collaborators with the Israelis.

Closure of the entire occupied territories or a portion of them began in 1991, though the practice became more widespread following the Oslo Accords. When closures were ordered even Palestinians with valid entry and work permits were denied entry in to Israel. In 1994 the Palestinian territories were closed for 43 days. That increased to 104 days in 1996 and another 87 days in 1997. Each internal closure resulted in preventing approximately 200,000 Palestinians, or 80% of the Palestinian workforce, from reaching their workplace. There are 13 major crossings through which Palestinians with work permits are allowed passage into Israel. In February 2018, Israel increased the number of work permits for Palestinian to 100,000. Israeli law requires companies to offer benefits including health insurance, pensions, and sick days to Palestinian workers with permits, but many continue to work without permits, often at lower wages.

=== Permits to cultivate one's land ===
Palestinians separated from their agricultural properties by the erecting of the Separation Barrier require permits to work their land. Daniel Byman cites the case of Mohammad Jalud, a resident of Izbat Jalud near Qalqilya. His fields lie 10 minutes walk from his home. When the wall was built, an access gate to cross through was constructed by the village, but initially denied Palestinian transit. To work his farm he had to walk northwards several miles, cross at Azzun Atma with the required permit, and then go south to his property. In 2004, when permits to cross at his village became available, he was denied one, on the grounds he already had a permit for crossing up north. That first permit was cancelled because he now had theoretical entry at his village, Izbat Jalud, which wasn't granted because he had the Azzun Atma permit. It took a year for him to secure the right permit to cross directly over from his home village.

=== Stay permits and expulsions ===
In 2007 Israel introduced "stay permits" which were required to legally reside within the West Bank. The permits were issued to Palestinians whose registered address in the Palestinian Population Registry was in the West Bank. That registry had however been frozen since 2000, resulting in Palestinians who had moved between Gaza and the West Bank when no permit to do so was required being denied the permit now needed to continue residing there. Berlanty Azzam, a student at Bethlehem University who had moved to the West Bank from Gaza in 2005, appealed such a case to the Israeli Supreme Court, when she, after being stopped at an Israeli checkpoint in October 2009, was found to not be in possession of the required stay permit and was expelled to Gaza that same night. The court found that she had not obtained the required stay permit, despite having moved to the West Bank before the introduction of those permits and her efforts to update her residency in the population registry being denied, and as such it upheld the Military Commander's authority to expel her. Several months later, the Military Commander issued Israeli Military Order 1650, which amended Military Order No. 329, an order that was issued in 1969 titled "Order Regarding Prevention of Infiltration". The amendment expanded the meaning of "infiltrator" from those who had entered the West Bank from Israel's neighboring countries that were considered enemy states, namely Jordan, Syria, Egypt and Lebanon, to also include Palestinians not holding a valid stay permit. As "infiltrators", such people are subject to immediate expulsion and prosecution with penalties up to seven years imprisonment. The order leaves tens of thousands of Palestinians potentially subject to arrest and expulsion.

== Building permits ==
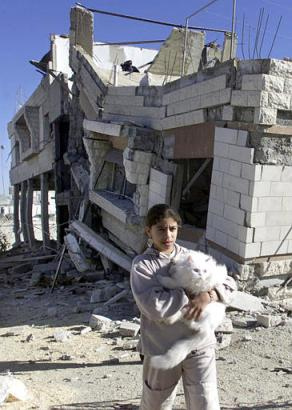
Demolished Palestinian home 2002

Israel introduced a building permit policy in East Jerusalem and Area C which made home construction for Palestinian residents challenging. It is estimated that 85 percent of the Palestinian houses in East Jerusalem are considered "illegal," meaning that since 1967 Palestinians built approximately 20 thousand homes without acquiring a necessary Israeli-issued construction permits. Israeli authorities demolished between 1987 and 2004 four hundred Palestinian homes. Israel has excluded thousands of Palestinians from its population registry, limiting their ability to reside in or travel from the West Bank and Gaza. Between 1967 and 2017 over 130,000 Palestinians in the West Bank and 14,565 in East Jerusalem had their residency permits revoked by Israeli authorities.

In a number of Palestinian neighborhoods in East Jerusalem Israel has, as of 2010, not issued a single building permit since 1967. Lack of a permit was given as the reason for the demolition of 730 Palestinian houses in this area between 2000 and 2009. Taking Jerusalem as a whole, for the one year 2004, 85% of known building violations were registered in predominantly Jewish West Jerusalem, and yet 91% of administrative demolition orders related only to East Jerusalem.

When pieces of land are fenced off from their traditional owners, often by declaring they lie within a closed military zone or on the Israeli seam land side of the Separation Barrier, a permit from the military administration is then required for the owner to access his fields: tending such fields becomes an arduous bureaucratic and physical task with access often allowed only once a year. The practice of denying usufruct in order to allow the 10 year expiry of rights to kick in was taken to the Israeli Supreme Court which, in 2006, arguing that the denial of access custom was akin to denying a person the right to enter his own home in order to defend himself from a thief, ruled in favour of the plaintiffs, and directed the IDF to ensure everything was done to ensure Palestinians could tend their olive groves. According to Irus Braverman, however, subsequent IDF regulations, guaranteeing tree protection in designated "friction zones" (ezorei hikuch) but not anywhere else, only complicated the issue. By 2018 it was calculated that of grants to people in the West Bank of areas Israel declared to be state lands, 99.7% was given to Israeli settlements, with 0.24% (400 acres (160 ha)) being earmarked for allocation to Palestinians who constitute 88% of the population.

== Study permits ==
Students from Gaza trying to obtain study permits for advanced educational institutions in the West Bank, such as Bir Zeit University, faced major difficulties, even if the permits were granted, in completing their degrees. In the 1990s, such permits, to travel and reside in the West Bank, were valid for three months, after which they had to be renewed. On average a Gaza student spent 15 hours in line to obtain a renewal for the fourth month of each semester. If the permit was cancelled, the student was obliged to restart. One condition placed on getting a permit was that the Gazan youths sign a statement in support of political negotiations. No reasons were ever forthcoming as to why many students had their permits cancelled.

== Legal opinions ==
Considered an example of racial profiling by scholars like Ronit Lentin, Yael Berda and others, the regime has been characterized as arbitrary and as one that turned such rights as freedom of movement into mere privileges that could be granted or revoked by the military authority. The regime itself has been likened to the South African pass laws under apartheid, (Note: "Both South Africa and Israel have turned questions of land and 'demography' (to abide by the Israeli euphemism) into national obsessions, and have devised elaborate systems of repression and discrimination around them. Both view themselves as 'outposts of western civilization'; both are wont to claim Biblical justification and enjoy the support of organized religion domestically (though not unanimously); both are national security states with a broad emphasis on counterinsurgency and methods of psychological warfare. The parallels extend to the finer print as well, with South Africa's pass laws, and Israel's special IDs for Arabs (stamped with a 'B') and requirements for travel passes in the occupied territories." (Pieterse 1984, p. 65)) with Jennifer Loewenstein writing that the regime is "more complex and ruthlessly enforced than the pass system of the apartheid regime." Israel has defended the permit regime as necessary to protect Israelis in the West Bank against what it describes as continued threats of attacks by Palestinian militants.

=== Comparisons to apartheid ===
The use of permits for Palestinians has been compared to South African apartheid. Jan Pieterse wrote that the use of travel passes for Palestinians in the occupied territories paralleled the pass laws in South Africa. HaMoked, an Israeli human rights organization, filed a petition with the Supreme Court of Israel calling for the revoking of the permit regime on the basis that it effectively institutes apartheid. HaMoked argued that requiring permits from one population, the Palestinians, and not from another, Israelis, in the same area is "necessarily comparable to the Pass Laws of apartheid South Africa". Sasha Polakow-Suransky writes that there are "ominously similar developments in today's Israel" to the system of pass laws and influx control instituted under apartheid, writing that not only are there "Israeli-only" roads crossing through the West Bank, but that it is now illegal for an Israeli to transport a Palestinian in their own vehicles without a proper permit. Andy Clarno of the University of Illinois at Chicago writes that the comparisons between South African Apartheid demonstrate that "the regime of political domination in Palestine/Israel today" is a form of apartheid that is potentially more extreme than that practiced by the South African government, writing that recent studies "trace similarities between the South African 'pass laws' and the permit regime that the State of Israel uses to classify, track, and control the movement of Palestinians from the occupied territories". Leila Farsakh writes that the splitting of the West Bank into eight districts from which Palestinians could not leave without a permit effectively turned those areas into bantustans. Amira Hass writes that the permit system functions like the apartheid pass system, noting that between 1967 and 1991 Palestinians largely had freedom of movement throughout the Palestinian territories and in Israel except for some defined exceptions, and in 1991 this was reversed with freedom of movement denied with limited exceptions determined by the Israelis.

== See also ==
- Human rights in Israel
- Israeli permit regime in the Gaza Strip
- Palestinian workers in Israel
- Palestinian freedom of movement

== Sources ==
- Abowd, Thomas Philip (2014). Colonial Jerusalem: The Spatial Construction of Identity and Difference in a City of Myth, 1948-2012. Syracuse University Press. ISBN 978-0-815-65261-8.
- Al-Qadi, Nasser (2018). The Israeli Permit Regime: Realities and Challenges. ARIJ.
- Azoulay, Ariella; Ophir, Adi (2012). The One-State Condition: Occupation and Democracy in Israel/Palestine. Stanford Studies in Middle Eastern and Islamic Societies and Cultures. Translated by Tal Haran. Stanford University Press. ISBN 978-0-8047-8433-7.
- Ben-Naftali, Orna; Sfard, Michael; Viterbo, Hedi (2018). The ABC of the OPT: A Legal Lexicon of the Israeli Control over the Occupied Palestinian Territory. Cambridge University Press. ISBN 978-1-107-15652-4.
- Berda, Yael (2017b). Living Emergency: Israel's Permit Regime in the Occupied West Bank. Stanford University Press. ISBN 978-1-5036-0529-9.
- Berda, Yael (16 November 2017a). "Israel's Expanding Permit Regime". Stanford University Press Blog.
- Booth, William; Taha, Sufian (25 May 2017). "A Palestinian's daily commute through an Israeli checkpoint". The Washington Post.
- Bornstein, Avram S. (2002). Crossing the Green Line Between the West Bank and Israel. University of Pennsylvania Press. ISBN 978-0-812-21793-3.
- Braverman, Irus (Spring 2007). "Powers of Illegality: House Demolitions and Resistance in East Jerusalem". Law and Social Inquiry. 32 (2): 333–372. doi:10.1111/j.1747-4469.2007.00062.x. JSTOR 20108706. S2CID 145121175.
- Braverman, Irus (September 2008). ""The Tree Is the Enemy Soldier": A Sociolegal Making of War Landscapes in the Occupied West Bank". Law & Society Review. 42 (3): 449–482. doi:10.1111/j.1540-5893.2008.00348.x. JSTOR 29734134.
- Braverman, Irus (November 2009). "Uprooting Identities: The Regulation of Olive Trees in the Occupied West Bank". Political and Legal Anthropology Review. 32 (2): 237–264. doi:10.1111/j.1555-2934.2009.01061.x. JSTOR 24497464.
- Byman, Daniel (2011). A High Price: The Triumphs and Failures of Israeli Counterterrorism. Oxford University Press. p. 168. ISBN 978-151139680-6 – via Internet Archive.
- Cahana, Aelad; Kanonich, Yonatan (March 2013). The Permit Regime Human Rights Violations in West Bank Areas Known as the "Seam Zone" (PDF). Translated by Maya Johnston. HaMoked. ISBN 978-9-657-62501-9.
- Clarno, Andy (2017). Neoliberal Apartheid: Palestine/Israel and South Africa After 1994. University of Chicago Press. ISBN 978-0-226-43009-6.
- Ehrenreich, Ben (2016). The Way to the Spring: Life and Death in Palestine. Granta Books. ISBN 978-1-783-78312-0.
- Essed, Philomena; Farquharson, Karen; Pillay, Kathryn; White, Elisa Joy, eds. (2018). Relating Worlds of Racism: Dehumanisation, Belonging, and the Normativity of European Whiteness. Palgrave Macmillan. ISBN 978-3-319-78990-3.
- Farsakh, Leila (2015). "Apartheid, Israel and Palestinian Statehood". In Pappé, Ilan (ed.). Political Awakenings: Conversations with History. Zed Books. pp. 161–189. ISBN 978-178360592-7.
- Filiu, Jean-Pierre (2014). Gaza: A History. Oxford University Press. ISBN 978-0-19-020191-3.
- Glanz, James; Nazzal, Rami (20 June 2016). "Smugglers in West Bank Open Door to Jobs in Israel, and Violence". The New York Times.
- Gordon, Neve (2008a). Israel's occupation. University of California Press. ISBN 978-0-520-25531-9.
- Gordon, Neve (2008b). "From Colonization to Separation: exploring the structure of Israel's occupation". Third World Quarterly. 29 (1): 25–44. doi:10.1080/01436590701726442. ISSN 0143-6597. S2CID 145554435.
- Gross, Aeyal (2017). The Writing on the Wall: Rethinking the International Law of Occupation. Cambridge University Press. ISBN 978-1-107-14596-2.
- Handel, Ariel (2010). "Exclusionary surveillance and spatial uncertainty in the occupied Palestinian territories". In Zureik, Elia; Lyon, David; Abu-Laban, Yasmeen (eds.). Surveillance and Control in Israel/Palestine: Population, Territory and Power. Routledge. pp. 259–274. ISBN 978-1-136-93097-3.
- Hass, Amira (2010). "Seeking Truth". In Kreisler, Harry (ed.). Political Awakenings: Conversations with History. The New Press. pp. 101–119. ISBN 978-1-595-58552-3.
- Hass, Amira (13 October 2018). "Israel Seeks to Deport to Brazil Man Who Has Lived Almost Entire Life in West Bank". Haaretz.
- Hass, Amira (14 January 2019). "When Freud Visits Israel's Civil Administration in the West Bank". Haaretz.
- Hass, Amira (8 August 2021). "Israeli Soldiers Kill an 11-year-old Palestinian, and His Brother Still Hears the Shooting". Haaretz.
- Hiltermann, Joost R. (Winter 1990). "Israel's Strategy to Break the Uprising". Journal of Palestine Studies. 19 (3): 87–98. doi:10.2307/2537415. JSTOR 2537415.
- "The Humanitarian Monitor: OPT (April 2010) - OCHA report" (PDF). OCHA oPt. 20 May 2010. Archived from the original (PDF) on 6 June 2016.
- "Israel: 50 Years of Occupation Abuses". Human Rights Watch. 4 June 2017.
- Kershner, Isabel (17 July 2018). "In West Bank, 99.7% of Public Land Grants by Israel Go to Settlers". The New York Times.
- Khalidi, Rashid (2006). The Iron Cage: The Story of the Palestinian Struggle for Statehood. Beacon Press. p. 200. ISBN 978-0-807-00315-2 – via Internet Archive.
- Laub, Karin; Daraghmeh, Mohammed (30 April 2018). "For Palestinians, Israeli permits a complex tool of control". Associated Press.
- Lazar, Hadara (February 1990). The system of taxation in the West Bank and Gaza Strip as an instrument for the enforcement of Authority during the Uprising (DOC). B'Tselem.
- Lentin, Ronit (2018). Traces of Racial Exception: Racializing Israeli Settler Colonialism. Bloomsbury Publishing. ISBN 978-1-350-03205-7.
- Levinson, Chaim (23 December 2011). "Israel Has 101 Different Types of Permits Governing Palestinian Movement". Haaretz. Archived from the original on 22 August 2019.
- Littman, Shany (12 April 2018). "How the Shin Bet got unlimited power to decide which Palestinians are allowed into Israel". Haaretz.
- Loewenstein, Jennifer (August 2006). "Identity and movement control in the OPT" (PDF). Forced Migration Review. 26. Refugee Studies Centre: 24–26. Archived from the original (PDF) on 19 February 2023.
- Margalit, Alon; Hibbin, Sarah (2011). "Unlawful Presence of Protected Persons in Occupied Territory? An Analysis of Israel's Permit Regime and Expulsions from the West Bank under the Law of Occupation". In Schmitt, Michael N.; et al. (eds.). Yearbook of International Humanitarian Law. Vol. 13. Cambridge University Press; Springer; Asser Press. pp. 245–282. doi:10.1007/978-90-6704-811-8_7. ISBN 978-90-6704-810-1.
- "New Israeli military order could increase expulsions of West Bank Palestinians". Amnesty International. 28 April 2010.
- Peteet, Julie (February 1994). "Male Gender and Rituals of Resistance in the Palestinian "Intifada": A Cultural Politics of Violence". American Ethnologist. 21 (1): 31–49. doi:10.1525/ae.1994.21.1.02a00020. JSTOR 646520.
- Peteet, Julie (2017). Space and Mobility in Palestine. Public Cultures of the Middle East and North Africa. Indiana University Press. ISBN 978-0-253-02511-1.
- Pieterse, Jan (1984). "State Terrorism on a Global Scale: The Role of Israel". Crime and Social Justice. 21–22 (4): 58–80. JSTOR 29766230.
- Playfair, Emma (Fall 1988). "Israel's Security Needs in the West Bank, Real and Contrived". Arab Studies Quarterly. 10 (4): 406–423. JSTOR 41857980.
- Polakow-Suransky, Sasha (2010). The Unspoken Alliance: Israel's Secret Relationship with Apartheid South Africa. Jacana Media. ISBN 978-1-770-09840-4.
- Rubenberg, Cheryl (2019). "The Palestinians: Justice Denied". In Hoffman, Valerie J. (ed.). Making the New Middle East: Politics, Culture, and Human Rights. Syracuse University Press. pp. 222–283. ISBN 978-0-815-65457-5.
- Shehadeh, Raja (1985a). Occupier's law: Israel and the West Bank. Institute for Palestine Studies. ISBN 978-0-887-28149-5.
- Shehadeh, Raja (Spring–Summer 1985b). "Some Legal Aspects of Israeli Land Policy in the Occupied Territories". Arab Studies Quarterly. 7 (2–3): 42–61. JSTOR 41857768.
- Van Esveld, Bill (19 December 2010). Separate and Unequal: Israel's Discriminatory Treatment of Palestinians in the Occupied Palestinian Territories (PDF). Human Rights Watch.
- Zaken, Dan (22 February 2018). "Israel to issue 20,000 more work permits to Palestinians". The Jerusalem Post.
- Ziai, Fatemeh (2001) [First published 1999]. "Human rights violations as an obstacle to economic development: restrictions on movement in the West Bank and the Gaza Strip". In Wright Jr, J.W. (ed.). The Political Economy of Middle East Peace: The Impact of Competing Trade Agendas. Routledge. pp. 128–153. ISBN 978-1-134-69013-8.
- Zureik, Elia (2015). Israel's Colonial Project in Palestine: Brutal Pursuit. Routledge. ISBN 978-1-317-34046-1.
