= Work permit =

Document permitting holder to work

A work permit or work visa is the permission to take a job within a foreign country. The foreign country where someone seeks to obtain a work permit for is also known as the "country of work", as opposed to the "country of origin" where someone holds citizenship or nationality. Work permits were found to crowd out citizens.

== Australia ==
Several different types of visas are available for immigrants, including skilled migration visas, family reunion visas, student visas, and humanitarian visas.

== European Union ==
Currently, every EU country has a different process for granting work permits to nationals of non-EU countries. To address this issue, the European Commission began work in 1999 on developing an EU-wide process for the entry of non-EU nationals into the work force. In October 2007, they adopted a proposal to introduce a work permit similar to the United States' "Green Card" program, called the "Blue Card". It is similar to the UK's Highly Skilled Migrant Programme, with the exception that it will require an employment contract in place prior to migration. After two years in the first country, the migrant will be allowed to move and work in another EU country, and can sum the number of years spent in the EU for purposes of residency. This new card will abolish work permits across the EU and centralize the issuing from Brussels.

=== Czech Republic ===
The issuing of work permit in the Czech Republic is governed by three basic sources: labor code, Act No. 435/2004 Coll. On employment and Act no. 326/1999 Coll. On the residence of foreign nationals. There are various rights and obligations depending on nationality.

=== France ===
A foreigner seeking to work in France must obtain work authorization (authorisation de travail) with a visa, a residence permit or a special document by the government.

=== Germany ===
The Employment Ordinance (BeschV) governs the admission of newly arriving foreigners as employees for entry and the exercise of employment. Permission is generally granted only for the activities specified in the Besch, (e.g., au pair; specialty chefs; scientists at public institutions; journalists).

=== Poland ===
A work permit in Poland is issued for a specified period of time, not longer than 3 years. If a foreigner serves on the management board of a legal person which, as at the date of submitting the application, employs more than 25 people, the voivode may issue a work permit for a period not longer than 5 year.

Work permits are issued by the relevant voivode based on an employer's application and are specific to the position, employer, and location.

A foreigner cannot begin employment until the permit is granted, unless exempt under specific legal provisions.

A foreigner may apply for a national work visa at a Polish consulate in their home country on the basis of a valid work permit issued by the voivode (Voivodeship Office).

== United Kingdom ==
There are seven standard ways to apply for a work permit in the United Kingdom: the Business and Commercial Arrangements, the Training and Work Experience Arrangements, the Sports people and Entertainers Arrangements, Student Internships, GATS, Ancestry Visa and the Sectors Based Scheme. All applications require the work permit holder to leave the country where the work permit was issued every three months under the Work Permit Arrangements. Costs for leaving the airport are £64, per person and you must return to the airport after 24 hours or one working day to leave the country. If you remain in the airport the cost is £35 per person and you must leave the country after 24 hours or one working day in the airport. Each of these involves its own application process, and generally requires a job offer from a UK employer.

The UK work permit system is currently being replaced by a new points-based immigration system based on tiers for skilled workers.

== Russia ==
According to the Federal Migration Service of Russia estimates, in Russia today there are 5 million working foreign nationals.

In order to work in Russia, foreign citizens must have a work visa (visa for arriving at the order) to obtain a work permit and get on migration registration in the Russian Federal Migration Service bodies.

For foreign citizens arriving without visas (CIS countries except Turkmenistan and Georgia) there is a simplified procedure. The period of temporary stay for them is 90 days, but can be extended up to one year from the date of entry into the Russian Federation on presentation of the migration service of the employment contract or a contract of civil-legal nature. That is, a foreigner can obtain a work permit for up to 90 days, and then to extend it after the job. However, it is recommended to immediately impose a labor or civil contract and to issue a work permit for the duration of its validity.

Issuance of work permits is carried out taking into account the established quota. The quota is divided by region, Russia and the integrated vocational qualification groups.

A work permit is divided to some categories:

- Qualified professionals are employed by their existing profession (specialty), included in the approved list of professions (specialties, positions);
- Highly qualified professionals engaged in labor activity in accordance with the provisions of Article 13 of the Federal Law "On the Legal Status of Foreign Citizens in the Russian Federation."

The work permit is valid within the subject of the Russian Federation, in which it was issued.

== Ukraine ==
Foreigners and stateless persons can be employed in Ukraine after obtaining an appropriate permit. These requirements are established by article 42 of the Law of Ukraine "On Employment". State Employment Service of Ukraine is the main authority to issue work permit.

Does not require obtaining a work permit for:

- foreigners who have residence permit in Ukraine;
- refugees;
- foreigners who have permission to immigrate to Ukraine;
- foreigners who are recognized as persons in need of additional protection, or who are granted temporary protection in Ukraine;
- representatives of foreign maritime (river) fleet and airlines that serve such companies on the territory of Ukraine;
- employees of foreign media who are accredited to work in Ukraine;
- professional athletes, artists and art workers to work in Ukraine;
- workers of emergency services for urgent work;
- employees of foreign representative (branch) office that are registered in the territory of Ukraine in accordance with the procedure established by the law;
- ecclesiastic who are to reside in Ukraine temporarily (on the ground of invitation of religious organization) for canonical activity only in such religious organization;
- foreigners who arrived in Ukraine to participate in the implementation of international technical assistance projects;
- foreigners who arrived in Ukraine to conduct teaching and / or scientific activities in higher education institutions;
- other foreigners in cases provided by laws and international treaties of Ukraine;
- Foreign Ukrainians, as long as they hold a Foreign Ukrainian ID Booklet.

== United States ==
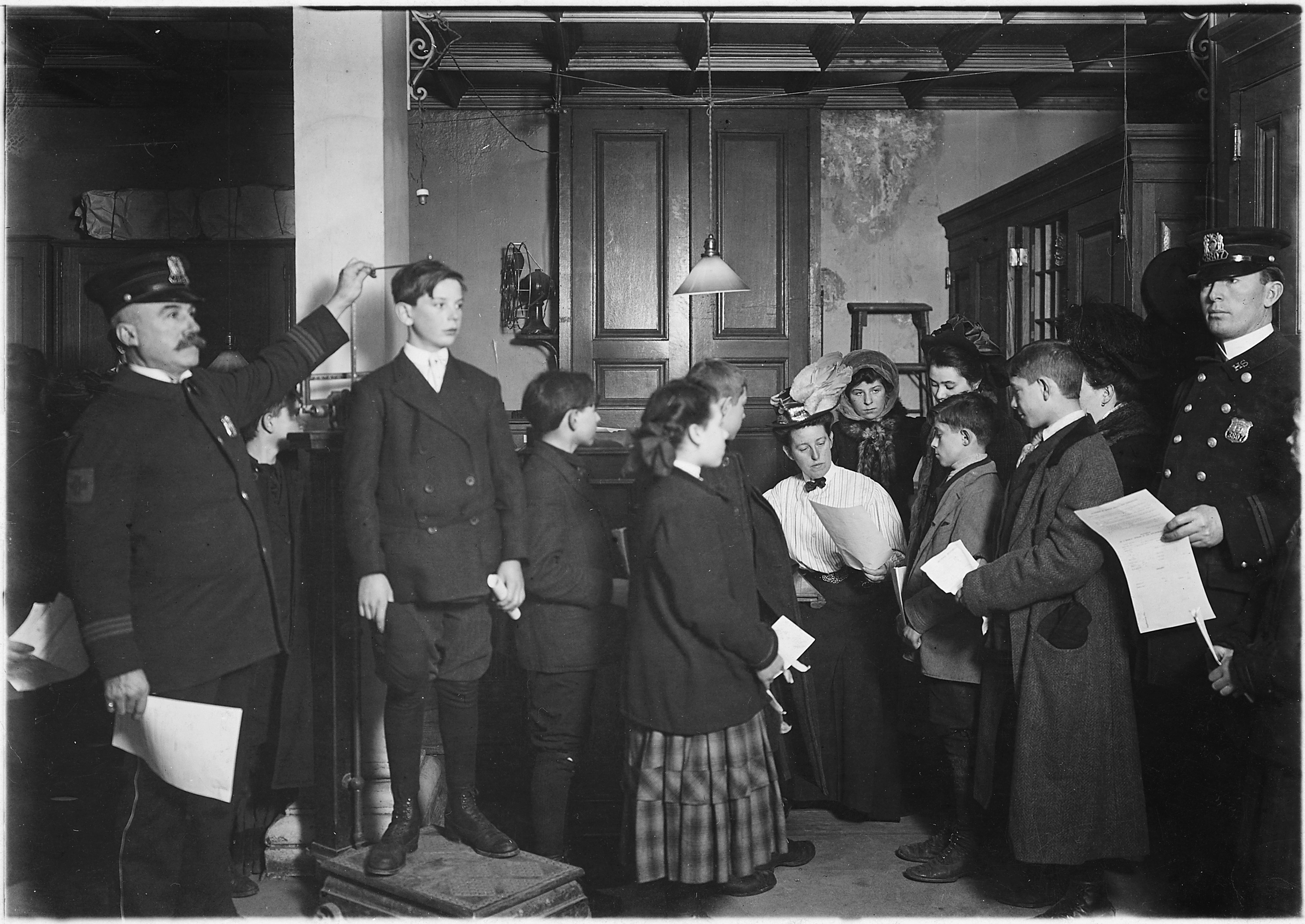
Applying for working papers, 1908 (United States Children's Bureau)

In general, the United States does not require work permits for adult citizens. However, certain people are required to have an Employment Authorization Document from the United States Citizenship and Immigration Services (USCIS) of the Department of Homeland Security (DHS).

The federal government of the United States does not require work permits or proof-of-age certificates for a minor to be employed. However, the possession of an age certificate constitutes a good faith effort to comply with minimum age requirements of the Fair Labor Standards Act of 1938. The United States Department of Labor will issue a "certificate of age" if the minor employee's state does not issue them, or if the minor is requested by his or her employer to provide one. Several states are not listed in 29 CFR 570.9(a), such as Alaska, Arizona, Idaho, Kansas, Mississippi, South Carolina, Texas, and Utah, and thus their certificates may not meet the requirements of 29 CFR 570.5(b) as being evidence of compliance with the Fair Labor Standards Act.

Many states also require them for workers of certain ages. In some states, for example New Jersey, permits are only required for minors 14 and 15 years old, while others such as Massachusetts require, at least in theory, work permits for all minors until they turn 18 years of age. In some states, enforcement is strict. Permits are usually issued through the school system the minor attends, and typically at a minimum is conditioned on enrollment in high school with regular attendance (no chronic absenteeism, tardiness, or truancy). Some states such as New York and Indiana require high school students with part-time jobs to maintain a certain grade point average. Minors who are working are usually restricted in the number of hours each day or week they are permitted to work as well as the types of jobs they may hold.

== Turkey ==
The immigration in Turkey is regulated by the General Directorate of Immigration Management (Göç İdaresi Genel Müdürlüğü) under the supervision of the Ministry of Interior while work permits are delivered by the General Directorate of Labor Immigration (Uluslararası İşgücü Genel Müdürlüğü) under the supervision of the Ministry of Labour and Social Security (Türkiye Cumhuriyeti Çalışma ve Sosyal Güvenlik Bakanlığı). All applications for both residence permit and work permit are made through online government portals. The residence permit application is made through " "e-Residence" (e-İkamet) while Turkish work permit application are made through e-Government (Turkey) (e-Devlet).

== South Africa ==
The South African Immigration Act, as amended, and which came into effect on 26 May 2014, makes provision for three different categories of work visas that a foreigner may apply for to work in South Africa. These are the General Work Visa, the Critical Skills Work Visa, and the Intra-Company Transfer Work Visa.

General Work Visa – This work visa is based on an offer of employment from a South African prospective employer. The employer must apply to the Department of Labour (DOL) for a certification that confirms to the Department of Home Affairs (DHA) whether there exist suitably qualified South African candidates for the position and that the foreign applicant possesses the necessary skills and qualifications. Once the DOL has concluded its mandate and conveyed its certification, the visa application is filed. The DHA will approve or refuse a general work visa application based on compliance with statutory requirements.

Critical Skills Work Visa – A Critical Skills Work Visa may be issued to a foreign national based on educational qualifications and/or professional experience for up to 5 years if supported by a contract of employment, or for 1 year if not. Skills that are recognised as critical for immigration purposes are listed in the Critical Skills List, published in the Government Gazette. Each skill is associated with a specific sector of employment and may require registration with a SAQA-recognised professional body.

Intra-Company Transfer Work Visa – An Intra-Company Transfer (ICT) work visa is issued to a foreigner who has been employed by a foreign entity for at least 6 months and is transferred to a South African branch, subsidiary, or associate office. A skills transfer plan must accompany the application. This visa is valid for up to 4 years and cannot be renewed or changed from within South Africa. It also does not qualify the holder for permanent residency status.

== Canada ==
Canada work permits are issued under the Temporary Foreign Worker Program (TFWP) by Immigration, Refugees and Citizenship Canada (IRCC).

The TFWP has four streams: high-skilled workers, low-skilled workers, the Seasonal Agricultural Worker Program, and the Live-In Caregiver Program.

The Canadian work permit is divided into two types: open work permits and employer-specific work permits. With an open work permit, an applicant can work for any employer, while an employer-specific permit limits employment to one specific employer.

Work permits are generally issued for a limited period, but workers can apply to extend or renew their permits before expiry in order to maintain legal status in Canada.

To apply for a work permit, the employer may need to obtain a Labour Market Impact Assessment (LMIA) from Employment and Social Development Canada (ESDC). This confirms that no Canadian citizen or permanent resident is available for the position. After a positive LMIA, the employer may proceed with the work permit application.

== Israel-Palestine ==
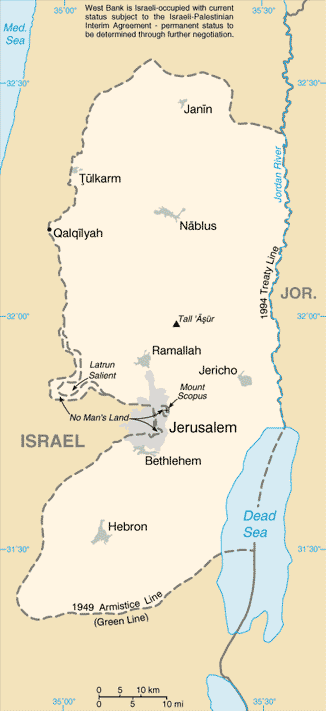
Map of the West Bank

The Israeli permit regime in the West Bank is the legal regime that requires Palestinians to obtain a number of separate permits from the Israeli military authorities governing Palestinians in the Israeli-occupied West Bank for a wide range of activities. (Note: "The most common permits are those allowing Palestinians to work in Israel, or in Jewish settlements in the West Bank. Over the decades, however, the permit regimen has grown into a vast, triple-digit bureaucracy." (Levinson 2011)) The first military order requiring permits for the Palestinians was issued before the end of the 1967 Six-Day War. The two uprisings of 1987 and 2001 were met by increased security measures, differentiation of IDs into green and red, policies of village closures, curfews and more stringent restrictions on Palestinian movement, with the general exit permit of 1972 replaced by individual permits. The stated Israeli justification for this new permit regime regarding movements was to contain the expansion of the uprisings and protect both the IDF and Israeli civilians from military confrontations with armed Palestinians. The regime has since expanded to 101 different types of permits covering nearly every aspect of Palestinian life, governing movement in Israel and in Israeli settlements, transit between Gaza and the West Bank, movement in Jerusalem and the seam zone, and travel abroad via international borders. The Israeli High Court has rejected petitions against the permit regime, allowing that it severely impinges on the rights of Palestinian residents but that the harm was proportionate.

Considered an example of racial profiling by scholars like Ronit Lentin, Yael Berda and others, the regime has been characterized as arbitrary and as one that turned such rights as freedom of movement into mere privileges that could be granted or revoked by the military authority. The regime itself has been likened to the South African pass laws under apartheid, (Note: "Both South Africa and Israel have turned questions of land and 'demography' (to abide by the Israeli euphemism) into national obsessions, and have devised elaborate systems of repression and discrimination around them. Both view themselves as 'outposts of western civilization'; both are wont to claim Biblical justification and enjoy the support of organized religion domestically (though not unanimously); both are national security states with a broad emphasis on counterinsurgency and methods of psychological warfare. The parallels extend to the finer print as well, with South Africa's pass laws, and Israel's special IDs for Arabs (stamped with a 'B') and requirements for travel passes in the occupied territories." (Pieterse 1984, p. 65)) with Jennifer Loewenstein writing that the regime is "more complex and ruthlessly enforced than the pass system of the apartheid regime." Israel has defended the permit regime as necessary to protect Israelis in the West Bank against what it describes as continued threats of attacks by Palestinian militants.

== Philippines ==
In the Philippines, legal employment of a foreigner in the country for a period of more than six months requires an alien employment permit (AEP) which is issued by the Department of Labor and Employment. A special working permit (SWP) issued by the Bureau of Immigration is required instead for foreigners intending to work in the country for a period of less than six months.

== Singapore ==
In Singapore, the Ministry of Manpower (MOM) issues work passes to eligible foreigners in accordance to the Employment of Foreign Manpower Act (EFMA).

There are three main categories of work passes:

- Work Permit (WP) - for unskilled and semi-skilled workers. Subject to quota^{a}, levy^{b} and nationality requirements. Not allowed to bring family members to Singapore. Not eligible to apply for permanent residence. Marriage restrictions apply; current or former WP holders must seek approval from MOM before marrying a Singapore citizen or permanent resident.

Subsets of Work Permit include Work Permit for foreign domestic worker, Work Permit for confinement nanny and Work Permit for performing artiste working in public entertainment outlets. From 1 June 2026, the Work Permit for performing artiste scheme will be scrapped.

- S Pass (SP) - for mid-level skilled staff and technicians earning a fixed monthly salary of at least S$2,300. Subject to quota and levy requirements but not subject to nationality restriction. Allowed to bring family members to Singapore if earning a fixed monthly salary of at least S$6,000. Eligible to apply for permanent residence.
- Employment Pass (EP) - for professionals, managers and executives earning a fixed monthly salary of at least S$3,600. Not subject to quota, levy and nationality requirements, but fair consideration must be given to qualified local jobseekers. Allowed to bring family members to Singapore if earning a fixed monthly salary of at least S$6,000. Eligible to apply for permanent residence.

A special type of EP is the Personalised Employment Pass (PEP). An EP holder can apply for a PEP if he/she earns a fixed monthly salary of at least S$12,000. For foreign executives relocating to Singapore and applying for a PEP, their last drawn fixed monthly salary must be at least S$18,000. The PEP is not tied to a particular employer, and the PEP holder can spend up to six months unemployed in Singapore. The PEP is valid for up to 3 years and non-renewable.

Other types of work passes include EntrePass (allowing entrepreneurs to set up businesses in Singapore), Work Holiday Pass (for eligible foreign students to work and holiday in Singapore), Training Employment Pass (short-term training for professionals) and Training Work Permit (short-term training for semi-skilled trainees).

In November 2020, the Singapore government announced plans for a new work pass called Tech.Pass, which will be available to applicants by January 2021. According to the Economic Development Board the Tech.Pass will be valid for two years, and is meant to attract skilled technology professionals in fields like e-commerce, artificial intelligence and cyber security.

In March 2026, Singapore announced that Tech.Pass would be replaced in January 2027 by a new Overseas Networks and Expertise Pass track for senior artificial-intelligence and technology professionals. Applicants for the ONE Pass (AI and Tech) track must generally have earned at least S$30,000 per month, comprising a fixed monthly salary of at least S$22,500 and eligible vested non-cash compensation such as employee stock options or share ownership. Applicants must also have accumulated at least five years of relevant senior leadership or technical experience during the preceding ten years.

Notes:

^a a number of locals (Singapore citizens or permanent residents) must be employed by the employer before a foreign worker can be hired
^b a daily or monthly tax on each foreign worker, borne by the employer

== Thailand ==
Foreigners holding a "B" visa and wishing to work or start a business in Thailand are required to obtain a work permit. The issuance of work permits is under the jurisdiction of the Ministry of Labor of Thailand. Work without permission in the Kingdom is criminally punishable. It takes 7 working days to process the application for a permit. If the applicant is qualified and able to use "One Stop Service Center", the work permit will only take one day.

According to the Emergency Decree on Non-Thais' Working Management No. 2, 2018, foreigners can work anywhere in the country without having to record these changes in the permit, but each employer must be listed in the book. If the employee is transferred to another office in another part of the country, the employer should notify the office of the Employment Department.

=== Duties ===
Thai government fees for a work permit:

- 100 Baht/form = Permit application Fee.
- 750 Baht = work permit not longer than 3 months.
- 1,500 Baht = work permit longer than 3 months but does not exceed 6 months.
- 3,000 Baht = work permit longer than 6 months but does not exceed 12 months.

Thai government fees for amendments:

- 500 Baht/Book = Substitute of a permit.
- 1,000 Baht/time = Permission to change or add job description.
- 3,000 Baht/time = Permission to remove or add an employer.
- 1,000 Baht/time = Permission to change or add the locality or place of work.
- 150 Baht/time = Permission to change or add conditions.

== See also ==
- Employment contract: proofs that a person has indeed acquired a work contract in a particular country
- Expatriate
- Exploitation of labour
- Global labor arbitrage
- Stamp 4
- Wage slavery

== Sources ==
- Abowd, Thomas Philip (2014). Colonial Jerusalem: The Spatial Construction of Identity and Difference in a City of Myth, 1948-2012. Syracuse University Press. ISBN 978-0-815-65261-8.
- Al-Qadi, Nasser (2018). The Israeli Permit Regime: Realities and Challenges. ARIJ.
- Ben-Naftali, Orna; Sfard, Michael; Viterbo, Hedi (2018). The ABC of the OPT: A Legal Lexicon of the Israeli Control over the Occupied Palestinian Territory. Cambridge University Press. ISBN 978-1-107-15652-4.
- Berda, Yael (16 November 2017). "Israel's Expanding Permit Regime". Stanford University Press Blog.
- Cahana, Aelad; Kanonich, Yonatan (March 2013). The Permit Regime Human Rights Violations in West Bank Areas Known as the "Seam Zone" (PDF). Translated by Maya Johnston. HaMoked. ISBN 978-9-657-62501-9.
- Clarno, Andy (2017). Neoliberal Apartheid: Palestine/Israel and South Africa After 1994. University of Chicago Press. ISBN 978-0-226-43009-6.
- Essed, Philomena; Farquharson, Karen; Pillay, Kathryn; White, Elisa Joy, eds. (2018). Relating Worlds of Racism: Dehumanisation, Belonging, and the Normativity of European Whiteness. Palgrave Macmillan. ISBN 978-3-319-78990-3.
- Gordon, Neve (2008). Israel's occupation. University of California Press. ISBN 978-0-520-25531-9.
- Gross, Aeyal (2017). The Writing on the Wall: Rethinking the International Law of Occupation. Cambridge University Press. ISBN 978-1-107-14596-2.
- Laub, Karin; Daraghmeh, Mohammed (30 April 2018). "For Palestinians, Israeli permits a complex tool of control". Associated Press.
- Lentin, Ronit (2018). Traces of Racial Exception: Racializing Israeli Settler Colonialism. Bloomsbury Publishing. ISBN 978-1-350-03205-7.
- Levinson, Chaim (23 December 2011). "Israel Has 101 Different Types of Permits Governing Palestinian Movement". Haaretz. Archived from the original on August 22, 2019.
- Loewenstein, Jennifer (August 2006). "Identity and movement control in the OPT" (PDF). Forced Migration Review. 26. Refugee Studies Centre: 24–26. Archived from the original (PDF) on 19 February 2023.
- Peteet, Julie (2017). Space and Mobility in Palestine. Public Cultures of the Middle East and North Africa. Indiana University Press. ISBN 978-0-253-02511-1.
- Pieterse, Jan (1984). "State Terrorism on a Global Scale: The Role of Israel". Crime and Social Justice. 21–22 (4): 58–80. JSTOR 29766230.
