= Refugee studies =

Refugee studies is the academic study of refugees and forced migration. It is an interdisciplinary field associated with the humanities, the social sciences and the political sciences. It is concerned with defining the concept of the refugee, with its own relations to policymaking and with issues of displacement, settlement and integration, and family and kinship networks. The field of refugee studies emerged in the twentieth century and has produced several (sub)fields and critiques, including forced migration studies and critical refugee studies. Important contributions to the field are published in the Journal of Refugee Studies, established by the Refugee Studies Centre at the University of Oxford.

== Development of refugee studies ==
According to Bhupinder S. Chimni, the evolution of the field of refugee studies can be divided into four phases. The first phase, lasting from 1914 to 1945, was characterized by mostly practical issues presented by the interwar period between World War I and World War II. Other academics, such as Richard Black, have affirmed that practical and policy related issues set the tone during this period. As Black describes, ''in a 1939 special issue of the Annals of the American Academy of Political and Social Science on refugees, nearly half of the 22 articles were devoted to exploring 'possible ways out' of the 'refugee problem.''' During the second phase, lasting from 1945 to 1982, academics' main concerns were with the refugee camps left by the wars' displacements, the International Refugee Organization (IRO), established in 1946, and the United Nations High Commissioner for Refugees (UNHCR), established in 1950. Between 1982 and 2000, the third phase of the evolution of the field of refugee studies strongly accelerated the field's development. Responding to growing numbers of refugees, including increased amounts of people from low income countries and postcolonial countries, academics made efforts to institutionalize the field of refugee studies. For some academics, this is the actual phase of inception. During the 1980s and 1990s, the Refugee Studies Programme (later the Refugee Studies Centre), the Journal of Refugee Studies and the International Research and Advisory Panel on Refugees and Other Displaced Persons (IRAP) were established. The fourth phase of the evolution of the field as described by Chimni is associated with a significant transformation. Whereas before refugees were the main focus, now also internally displaced persons (IDPs) were recognized as requiring academic study. An impactful related change is the shift toward the issue of forced migration.

== Key topics in refugee studies ==
=== Defining refugees ===
Over the past decades, the field of refugee studies has been concerned with defining the concept of the refugee. Describing the relevance of this question of definition, Roger Zetter claimed in 1991 that ''[l]abelling matters so fundamentally because it is an inescapable part of public policy making and its language'' and that ''[b]y reinforcing actions of designation, labelling means conditionality and differentiation, inclusion and exclusion, stereotyping and control.'' For international actors, including academics, the understanding of the concept of the refugee is based on the United Nations’ 1951 Refugee Convention and its 1967 Protocol. Through the convention refugees were first formulated as those who were considered refugees by earlier rulings. Second, refugees were considered those who

[a]s a result of events occurring before 1 January 1951 and owing to well-founded fear of persecution for reasons of race, religion, nationality, membership of a particular social group or political opinion, is outside the country of his nationality and is unable or, owing to such fear, is unwilling to avail himself of the protection of that country; or who, not having a nationality and being outside the country of his former habitual residence as a result of such events, is unable or, owing to such fear, is unwilling to return to it.

— United Nations, The Refugee Convention, 1951, Article 1

Apart from its temporal conditions, the convention focused on the European contexts. Through the protocol, both the time and place related conditions were removed. Since the United Nations (UN) provided its definition, academics of refugee studies have noticed and advocated changes to the use of the concept of the refugee. As stated by Zetter, forced migration has become increasingly complex, resulting in a transformation and politicization of the refugee label, especially in the West. This way, it has become conflated with labels such as those of the asylum seeker and the economic migrant.

=== Policymaking ===
Throughout its existence as a branch of research, refugee studies has been closely related to the making and evaluation of policy. As some have argued, the development of the field of refugee studies echoed the establishments of intergovernmental agencies such as UNHCR in 1950, which it examined and critiqued. In the 1980s, when the field greatly expanded, the concern with policy further increased. This change provided ''important insights into the effectiveness of refugee decision-making procedures, the role of UNHCR, and the impact of domestic and foreign policy factors on the implementation of refugee legal instruments.''

=== Displacement ===
An increase in the occurrence of displacement has been observed by academics in the field of refugee studies over the past decades. For this reason, the academic interest in defining this issue has grown. Studying displacement, authors have considered aspects such as the definition of the concept of displacement as well as its legal and geographical dimensions.

=== Settlement and integration ===
With the increase in the occurrence of displacement, an increase in the relevance of issues related with settlement and integration has taken place. Discussions associated with these issues have taken place around repatriation, refugee camps, resettlement, and the international refugee regime.

== Critiques of refugee studies ==
=== Forced migration studies ===
The field of forced migration studies emerged from the field of refugee studies in the 1990s. These two branches remain closely related, with Chimni considering the inception of the field of forced migration studies as the fourth and most recent phase of the evolution of the field of refugee studies. However, whereas the latter examines issues related to people who are refugees often as per the United Nations' 1951 Refugee Convention and its 1967 Protocol, the former also examines issues related to IDPs. Furthermore, humanitarianism and humanitarian intervention are more associated with forced migration studies, as are themes such as ''the smuggling and trafficking of persons … and the construction of a post conflict state.'' Forced migration studies is similar to migration studies for its focus on migration. The difference between the two lies in the inclusion or exclusion of the study of voluntary migration. A critique of refugee and forced migration studies is present in The Oxford Handbook of Refugee and Forced Migration Studies. In this book, several authors warn that, differentiating between migration studies, refugee studies and forced migration studies, as well as between migrants, refugees, IDPs and others, ''there is a risk that scholars are legitimizing labels that are … deliberately constructed to exclude and to disempower.'' A similar critique is put forward by Giulia Scalettaris, who states ''that the definitions of categories of people (such as 'refugees', 'migrants', 'internally displaced persons', 'environmental refugees', etc.) arising from the refugee and humanitarian regime are not necessarily meaningful in the academic field from an analytical point of view.'' Instead, ''[t]hey are policy related labels, designed to meet the needs of policy.''

=== Critical refugee studies ===
The (sub)field of critical refugee studies (CRS) emerged in the twentieth century as a form of critique of the field on refugee studies. As stated in Departures: An Introduction to Critical Refugee Studies, ''CRS emerges from a growing recognition of the need for a new approach to the study of refugees, a new analytic committed to realizing the meaningful change that refugee knowledges uniquely make desirable and achievable.'' The critique of CRS has been concerned with the representation and valuation of refugees and their epistemologies and practices.

== University of Oxford ==
During what Bhupinder S. Chimni described as the third phase of the evolution of refugee studies, characterized by ''rapid development,'' the University of Oxford made important contributions to the academic growth of the field. At the beginning of this phase, starting in 1982 and ending in 2000, the Refugee Studies Programme was founded in 1982-1983. Subsequently, the Journal of Refugee Studies was founded in 1988 to publish works on issues relevant to the field. In 1989-1990, the International Research and Advisory Panel on Refugees and Other Displaced Persons was established ''to provide advice and assistance to the Refugee Studies Programme ... and to the Journal of Refugee Studies.'' Out of IRAP, the International Association for the Study of Forced Migration (IASFM) was born in 1994.
