= Barbara Harrell-Bond =

British-American social scientist

- Born: Barbara Elaine Moir; November 7, 1932; Aberdeen, South Dakota, US
- Died: July 11, 2018 (aged 85); Oxford, United Kingdom
- Education: D.Phil., University of Oxford
- Occupation: Social anthropologist

Barbara Elaine Harrell-Bond (née Moir) OBE (7 November 1932 – 11 July 2018) was an American-born British social anthropologist in the field of refugee studies.

== Early life and education ==
Barbara Elaine Moir was born on 7 November 1932, daughter of postman Elmer Edwin Moir and nurse Irene (née Belden), and raised in Aberdeen, South Dakota. She attended Asbury College in Kentucky where she studied music and later taught music, and met her future husband, Nathan Harrell-Bond. When he won a scholarship to Mansfield College, Oxford for a doctorate in psychology, she began studying anthropology at the Lady Margaret Hall, Oxford in 1965 where she earned an M.Litt. (1967) and a D.Phil. in social anthropology.

== Academic career and the Refugee Studies Centre ==
Harrell-Bond was initially employed by the Department of Anthropology, University of Edinburgh, the African Studies Centre, Leiden, Holland, the School of Law, University of Warwick, and the American Universities Field Staff.

She founded the Refugee Studies Centre at Oxford University, the world's first institution for the study of refugees. It now hosts an annual lecture series named after her. On retirement in 1996, she conducted research on the extent to which refugees enjoy their rights in exile in Kenya and Uganda.

She also founded or helped to found refugee legal aid organizations in several locations, including the Refugee Law Project in Uganda and AMERA (Africa and Middle East Refugee Assistance) in Egypt, and worked with many young refugee rights lawyers such as Michael Kagan. In 2000 she was invited to the American University in Cairo to establish another refugee studies programme, the Center for Migration and Refugee Studies (CMRS). In 2005, Harrell-Bond was made an Officer of the Order of the British Empire for her contributions to refugee studies. In September 2008, she returned to Oxford where she worked on establishing a website, www.refugeelegalaidinformation.org, an information platform for legal aid practitioners in the global south as director of the Refugee Programme of Fahamu Trust, an international NGO working on social justice issues.

== Personal life ==
In 1951, Moir married Methodist pastor Nathan Samuel Harrell-Bond, with whom she had two sons and a daughter. On his return to America in 1969, they divorced, and she took the children with her whilst conducting research in Sierra Leone for her dissertation. She married secondly, in 1972, Dr Samuel Nwafor Okeke, a Nigerian engineer she met in Sierra Leone; they subsequently divorced.

== Death ==
Harrell-Bond resided in Oxford, United Kingdom. She died at home on 11 July 2018, at age 85.

== Books ==
- Modern Marriage in Sierra Leone (1975) ISBN 90-279-7871-9
- Community Leadership and the Transformation of Freetown (1978) ISBN 90-279-7525-6
- 4 June: A Revolution Betrayed (1982, as Barbara E. Okeke)
- Imposing Aid: Emergency Assistance to Refugees (1986) ISBN 0-19-261543-2
- Rights in Exile: Janus-Faced Humanitarianism (2005, with Guglielmo Verdirame) ISBN 1-84545-103-1
