= ICHS =

ICHS may refer to:

- Ilford County High School, Ilford, England
- Immaculate Conception High School (disambiguation)
- Inveralmond Community High School, Livingston, Scotland
- Indian Creek High School (Wintersville, Ohio), United States
- InTech Collegiate High School, North Logan, Utah, United States
- Integrative Center for Homeland Security, at Texas A&M University
- International Committee of Historical Sciences, international association of historical scholarship
