= IASFM =

IASFM may refer to:

- The International Association for the Study of Forced Migration
- Isaac Asimov's Science Fiction Magazine
