= Oxford Monitor of Forced Migration =

- Discipline: International relations, Sociology
- Language: English
- Edited by: Domiziana Turcatti and Andrea Ortiz

Publication details
- History: 2010–present
- Frequency: Biannual
- Open access: Yes

Standard abbreviations
- ISO 4: Oxf. Monit. Forced Migr.

Oxford Monitor of Forced Migration (OxMo) is a biannual publication engaging in a global intellectual dialogue about forced migration, supported by the Refugee Studies Centre at the University of Oxford.

== History and profile ==
Oxford Monitor of Forced Migration was founded in 2010 by graduate students at the University of Oxford's Refugee Studies Centre. The first issue was published in February 2011 with a foreword by Roger Zetter, Director of the Refugee Studies Centre.

Committed to presenting critical analyses of political, social and legal issues pertaining to forced displacement, migration, asylum and return, Oxford Monitor of Forced Migration places emphasis on monitoring the policies and actions of governments, international organizations and NGOs. It moves to engage with various aspects of forced migration through academic scholarship and is dedicated to advancing and protecting human rights of individuals who have been forcibly displaced.

The editors-in-chief are Domiziana Turcatti and Andrea Ortiz.
