= Israeli Military Order =

Command issued by the Israeli military

An Israeli Military Order is a general order issued by an Israeli military commander over territory under Israeli military occupation. It has the force of law. Enforcement of such orders is carried out by Israeli military police and military courts instead of civil courts.

Military Orders are still a basic instrument of Israeli rule of the Palestinian population in Area B and Area C of the West Bank. In contrast, Israeli civilians living in settlements in the area are usually subjected to civil courts.

Palestinians living in Area A of the West Bank, under full control of the Palestinian Authority, are now mostly subject to its laws and civil jurisdiction. Between the beginning of the Israeli occupation of the West Bank in 1967 and the establishment of the Palestinian Authority under the Oslo Accords in 1994, military orders were issued "in a constant stream," covering both criminal and civil matters as well as security and military matters.

== History ==
Israel inherited the British-imposed 1945 Defence (Emergency) Regulations, applying to whole British Mandatory Palestine. The regulations included, inter alia, the establishment of military tribunals to try civilians without granting the right of appeal, allowing sweeping searches and seizures, prohibiting publication of books and newspapers, demolishing houses, detaining individuals administratively for an indefinite period, sealing off particular territories, and imposing curfew.

In 1948, the newly established state of Israel incorporated the Defence (Emergency) Regulations into its national laws, with the exception of modification necessitated by the creation of the State or its authorities.

Although, in 1951, the Knesset determined that the Defence Regulations were contrary to the basic principles of democracy and instructed the Constitution, Law, and Justice Committee to draft a bill for their repeal, the regulations were not abolished. Any later prospects for partial repeal disappeared with the outbreak of the 1967 Six-Day War. The military governor in the Occupied Territories issued a military order "freezing" the legal situation then existing there. Since then the regulations and its system of military orders are extensively used in the Occupied Territories.

== Legal authority ==
The Israeli Military Orders are enacted in accordance to Article 43 of the Hague Regulations, ratified at the Hague Conventions. The Hague regulations authorize the military occupier of territories to implement new laws, intending to ensure ‘public order’ (translated from French). In reference to “Military Authority Over the Territory of the Hostile State,” Article 43 of the Hague Regulations states, “The authority of the legitimate power having in fact passed into the hands of the occupant, the latter shall take all the measures in his power to restore, and ensure, as far as possible, public order and safety, while respecting, unless absolutely prevented, the laws in force in the country” The interpretation and application of this Article was initially analyzed by the Israeli Supreme Court.

=== Initial applications of the Hague Regulations ===
One of the first applications of Article 43, which was deemed valid by the Israeli Supreme Court was the case of the Jerusalem District Electricity Company. The Court concluded that it was the military’s responsibility to address the economic welfare of the local population (in Jerusalem), and therefore should help meet the local demand for electricity for the Palestinians and Jewish settlers, specifically in the settlement of Kiryat Arba alike. However, the Supreme Court also validated the military’s prohibition of the “Al-Talia,” an Arab-centric weekly newspaper.

More significantly, the Supreme Court ruled that the military commander had the right to impose a “value tax” needed to obtain resources in order to fulfil the ‘public order and safety’ clause of Article 43. Much to the petitioners’ dismay, the law remained valid. Finally, the Supreme Court ruled in approval of the military’s confiscation of petitioners’ land, in order to build roads ultimately connecting the West Bank with Israel. The Court saw this as ensuring public order and growth. These cases all served to establish the role of the Hague Regulations, specifically that of Article 43, to be played in the context of Israel’s occupancy of the former Palestine.

== Examples of military orders ==
Officially beginning in 1967, the Israeli Military Orders are issued by the General Commanders and carried out by the Israel Defense Forces and ultimately affect the infrastructure, law, and administration particularly of the Palestinians of the region. Pursuant to Military Orders, the military is authorized to issue declarations holding more detailed orders; see for example Declaration s/2/03 (regarding the Separation Wall).

=== Orders to consolidate the occupation ===
- Military Order No. 1650 (2009): Order regarding Prevention of Infiltration (Amendment No. 2). This law modifies the definition of "infiltrator" in Military Order No. 329, and allows the IDF to arrest and imprison for seven years if the person "infiltrated" unlawful and for three years if lawful, but without a permit. An "infiltrator" is any person present in the West Bank without the appropriate permit, even if born in the West Bank or lawfully moved to it, for instance from Gaza or from abroad before a permit was required. Deportation of an "infiltrator" is considered an arrest. This broadened definition will allow thousands of Palestinians to be deported without a trial and without judicial review. Opposition to this law was voiced by the South African government (comparing it to pass laws of their apartheid), Richard Falk of the United Nations, The Euro-Mediterranean Human Rights Network, as well as Amnesty International.
  - Military Order No. 329 (1969): Order Regarding Prevention of Infiltration. Defined "infiltrators" as “a person who entered the Area knowingly and unlawfully after having been present (on) the east bank of the Jordan, Syria, Egypt or Lebanon following the effective date”.
- Military Order No. 947 (1981): This order created the Israeli Civil Administration in the West Bank. The head of the Civil Administration is appointed by the Commander of the IDF. It grants the Head of the Civil Administration the authority to draw up subsidiary legislation. Its purpose, as stated in Section 2 of the Order, is to “administer the civilian affairs in the region in accordance with the directives of this Order, for the well-being and good of the population, and in order to supply and implement the public services and taking into consideration the need to maintain an orderly administration and public order in the region”. All powers held by this Head of the Civilian Administration are ones delegated to him by the Area Commander, who can take away or grant power at their discretion. Although the chosen leader of the Civilian administration is someone of unspecified nationality, the headquarters is situated at Beit El, a restricted zone in an Israeli settlement community just north of Ramallah. Only those Palestinians summoned or able to schedule an appointment can enter that zone.
- Military Order No. 34 (1967): Order Regarding Closed Territories (Amendment). ″The territory of the West Bank is hereby declared a closed territory.″ 8 July 1967
- Military Order No. 1 (1967): Declares the Gaza Strip and West Bank closed military areas. A similar order was issued on 14 June 1967 for the occupied Golan Heights.

=== Land ===
Orders regarding the seizure of land has always been one of the most important means in the maintenance of the occupation. Initially, they were mainly issued for military reasons. Over the years, more and more land was seized for the establishment of settlements.

==== State land ====
The IDF has issued numerous orders to confiscate Palestinian lands by declaring it "State Land"

- Order No. 59 "Order Concerning State Property (Judea & Samaria)" (1967) established the 'Custodian of Government Property' to take control of land owned by the Jordanian Government (occupied in 1967). It also established the 'Custodian of Absentee Property' to appropriate land from individuals or groups by declaring it 'Public Land' or 'State Land'.

In January 2009, the IDF issued four military orders (No. 484 to 487) to evacuate land of Nahalin, southwest of Bethlehem under the claim that the targeted locations are 'State Land'. In the previous four years, the military already confiscated Nahalin lands by 25 different orders, labeling them 'State Land'. Most of the land was in Area C, where Israeli settlers already occupied land of Nahalin since 1967.

==== West Bank barrier ====
In 2000, Israel started the construction of the West Bank barrier, about 80% of which on Palestinian land. The Palestinian lands were seized by numerous Military Orders. Often the Wall runs across villages dividing them in separate parts. For example, in Al Jib and Beit Hanina. Many are cut off from their agriculture land, like Beit Ijza. Not only land for the Barrier itself, but also the land between the Wall and the Green Line (the Seam Zone) are confiscated, usually under the pretext of security:

- Declaration s/2/03 (2003): This declaration confiscates Palestinian lands on the Israeli side of the West Bank barrier and declares the Seam area a "Closed Zone" for Palestinians. Only Palestinians who live near the seam zone (which is part of the Occupied Territories) are allowed to enter through a single specific gate and stay, provided that they possess a personal written permit, usually for a limited period. The Declaration does not apply to Israelis.

==== Control over land transactions ====
- Military Order No. 811 and 847: allows Jews to purchase land from unwilling Palestinian sellers by using a “power of attorney.”
- Military Order No. 58: makes land transactions immune to review so long as the transaction was carried out by an Israeli “acting in good faith.”
  - Military Order No. 58, Article 5: says any land transaction will not be voided even if it is proved the transaction was invalid.
- Military Order No. 25 (1967): Order Regarding Land Transactions (Judea and Samaria). Forbids public inspection of land transactions. Restriction of land transactions in the West Bank.

=== Settlements ===
- Military Orders No. 783: Order Regarding the Management of Regional Councils and 892: Order Regarding the Management of Local Councils (1979). Granting the Jewish local authorities the status of territorial enclaves of Israeli law; Israeli law is applied to the settlements.

=== Water ===
Following the onset of the occupation in 1967, Israel brought all water resources in the Occupied Palestinian Territory under its military control, as stipulated by Military Order No. 92, issued in 1967. In line with the Oslo Accords—comprising the Declaration of Principles on Interim Self-Government Arrangements of 1993 and the Interim Agreement on the West Bank and the Gaza Strip of 1995, partial water governance responsibilities were transferred to the Palestinian Authority. Notably, the Interim Agreement on the West Bank and the Gaza Strip, also known as Oslo II, continues to serve as the primary framework for regulating water use in the West Bank. Initially intended as a five-year interim arrangement upon its conclusion in 1995, the agreement remains in effect to date.

- Military Order of 7 June 1997 states that ″all the water resources that have been occupied again are the property of the state of Israel″.
- Order No. 291 (1968). All pre-1967 land and water-related arrangements are declared invalid.
- Order No. 158 (1967): "Order Amending the Water Supervision Law" ordained that all wells, springs and water projects are under the full direct command of the Israeli Military Commander. Every installation or resource built without a permit will be confiscated.
- Order No. 92 (1967) states that it ″gives the absolute authority of controlling all issues related to water to the Water Officer who is appointed by the Israeli courts.″ Military Orders 498 and 558 of 1974 and 1977 transferred all powers to the IDF in Gaza.

The combination of these two orders 158 and 92 gave the Israeli authorities complete control over the entire water supplies in the West Bank and Gaza. Only the Head, appointed by the Area Commander, has influence in any issue regarding “transportation, extraction, export, consumption, sale, distribution, inspection of its use, purification, allotment of shares, the establishment of water projects, measurement, prevention of contamination, carrying out of studies and measurements in anything that deals with water matters, drilling wells, hearing of objections and all proceedings dealing with any of the above laws, etc., fixing and collecting fees, taxes and any payments for any of the above and any other matter which has not been mentioned specifically above which deals in any way whatsoever with water subjects.” For example, Article 4(A) of Order 158 specifically states that “it shall not be permissible for any person to set up or to assemble or to possess or to operate a water installation unless he has obtained a license from the Area Commander.” And although the exact number of granted licenses is disputed, the percentage is relatively small.

- Order No. 58 (1967) states that ″it is prohibited to construct any new water installation without a license and that the licensing officer has the right of rejecting any application for a license without having to give the justification for his rejection.″
- Order No. 948 states that every citizen in the Gaza Strip is compelled to obtain the approval of the Israeli military commander before implementing any water-related project.

=== Agriculture ===
- Military Order No. 1051 (1983): This order establishes an agricultural fund, to be financed by the Civil Administration. This fund will compensate for any excessive agricultural product, its uses, as well as any extra money needed to organize the marketing of that product. The money will come from the issuance of a new tax.
- Military Order No. 1015 (1982): Concerning Monitoring the Planting of Fruitful Trees. Permissions for planting trees; impose fees for permissions. Permits expire in one year or each June 15.
- Military Order No. 818: establishes how Palestinians can plant decorative flowers.
- Military Order No. 474: This order, an amendment to a Jordanian law requiring a certain amount of plants and trees to be maintained, states that the Area Commander can appoint inspectors to the specified areas, who may evict any violators of the law as well as take them to a police station.
- Military Order No. 134: This order makes a certificate/permit from the Area Commander necessary in order to move a tractor from Israel into the West Bank as well as to operate a tractor or any other form of agricultural machinery. This offense is punishable with imprisonment, a fine, or both.
- Military Order No. 2 Concerning Quarantine (7 June 1967): This order prohibited the transport of any plant or animal to outside the West Bank. This offense is punishable with three years of imprisonment.

=== Protests, gathering and political activities ===
- Military Order No. 101 (1967): Denies many basic freedoms that are required under the UN Universal Declaration of Human Rights. For example, it prohibits a gathering of more than 10 people unless the Israeli military receives advance notice with names of all participants, and enables some other activities (e.g. waving a flag or political symbol except by permission) that would generally be considered to be peaceful to become offenses carrying prison terms and fines.
- Military Order No. 537 (): Removes democratically elected Mayors of West Bank cities from their position.

=== Freedom of movement ===
- Military Order No. 418: This order served to abolish all local participation in the operations of local road planning. Previously, as laid out by the Jordanian planning law, various local institutions, such as the Engineers’ Union, would take part in a hierarchical structure and participate in the national planning committee. Instead, all planning was to be done by a military committee called the Higher Planning Committee, which was empowered to suspend any other plans or municipalities’ licenses and to exempt any person from the need to obtain a planning license.
- Military Order No. 96: This order forbids the purchase of goods on a donkey.

=== Criminal Code and Military Court ===
- Military Order No. 1651 (2009): Replaces 20 military orders issued between 1967 and 2005, including Military Order 378, which established the creation of Israeli military courts in occupied territory. Provides the basis for arrest and detention, including administrative detention to detain Palestinians without charge or trial for prolonged periods, by the Israeli army and defines charges under military law. Redefines categories of age to make possible higher penalties for children. Under this order "throwing stones at people or property can carry a ten-year jail sentence."
- Military Order No. 271: This order makes a certificate from the Area Commander necessary that affirms that any damage caused by an operation of the Israeli military or anyone working for the army was carried out “because of security needs.” Once obtained, the case can be heard by the Objections Committee.
- Military Order No. 172: This order established the military Objections Committee, which began as a tribunal to hear appeals initially regarding property rights, but has expanded greatly since. Now, for example, the Committee will hear appeals against the decisions of the military government, as well as any matters regarding expropriation of land, “Absentee property,” natural resources, unregistered land, violations of Order No. 818 (regarding decorative flowers)
- Military Order No. 164: This order requires permission to be granted for certain witnesses to appear and testify in court. However, this does not apply to any hearings before the Objections Committee (see Order No. 172).
- Military Order No. 56: This order serves to ensure that all objections submitted concerning the traffic authority’s decisions to cancel, suspend, or refuse to renew licenses will be reviewed by the Objections Committee, which is to be made up of three military officers.

=== Import and export ===
- Military Order 1252 (1988): Concerning Merchandise Transport. This order sets the standard for moving any sort of goods across the lines of the West Bank. In order to transport any sort of “merchandise,” one must present their permit, which can be personal or general. As for punishment, one cannot be fined then tried in court, yet they can be tried, and then fined if deemed necessary.

=== Other military orders ===
- Military Order 107: bans publications including works on Arabic grammar, histories of the Crusades, and works on Arab nationalism.
- Military Order No. 50: This Order strictly limits the people of the West Bank’s informative sources, as it “prohibits either the bringing to the area of any ‘newspaper’ or its ‘publication’ without a permit from the officer appointed by the Area Commander for the purposes of this Order.” The above definition of publication is used to include and prohibit all forms of publication, regardless of its origin, language, or the quantity it is in.
- Military Order No. 854: This Order was established to control the matriculation of the West Bank’s academic institutions. Under No. 854, the military has total control over who may enter a university as a student, teacher, or administrator. All students must have obtained an identity card distributed by the Area Commander before enrollment.
- Military Order No. 514: This order allows the Area Commander to appoint members of the committee, whose decisions are appealable to the Objections Committee, whose decisions serve as recommendations to the Area Commander, for situations regarding the Jordanian Pensions Law.
- Military Order No. 348: This order establishes a special department in the West Bank that will make final decisions regarding property in the West Bank, as the ultimate authority.
- Military Order 998: requires Palestinians to get Israeli military permission to make a withdrawal from their bank account.
- Military Order 93 and amendment: gives all Palestinian insurance businesses to the Israeli Insurance Syndicate.
- Military Order 128: gives the Israeli military the right to take over any Palestinian business which does not open during regular business hours.
- Military Order 847: declares only Israeli notaries can authenticate signatures.

== See also ==
- Martial law § Israel
- IDF Code of Ethics
