= Irus Braverman =

Israeli academic

Irus Braverman (Hebrew: אירוס ברוורמן) is an Israeli legal scholar and ethnographer. She is a professor of law and an adjunct professor of geography at the University at Buffalo (SUNY).

== Education and career ==
Irus Braverman trained in law and criminology at the Hebrew University of Jerusalem. In Israel, she served as a public state prosecutor and an environmental lawyer, later becoming a community organizer for environmental justice and a political activist.

Braverman wrote her doctorate in law about the politics of tree planting and uprooting in Israel/Palestine, which became the basis for a book entitled Planted Flags: Trees Law, and Law in Israel/Palestine. She has been an associate with the Humanities Center at Harvard University, a visiting fellow with the Human Rights Program at Harvard University Law School, and a junior fellow with the Center of Criminology at the University of Toronto, among others.

In 2013, Braverman was appointed a residential fellow at Cornell University's Society for the Humanities, and in 2014 was a fellow of the American Council for Learned Societies (ACLS) as a Ryskamp Grantee. In the summers of 2017 and 2018 she was a residential fellow at the Rachel Carson Center for Environment and Society in Munich. In the fall of 2021, she was the Hurford Family Fellow at the National Humanities Center.

Braverman's scholarship focuses on "the imbrications between law, space, and power, with an emphasis on materiality." Her work explores the tensions between governance and natural and unnatural environments, including zoos, public toilets, and tree landscapes.

Braverman's book Zooland: The Institution of Nature was awarded the 2013 Independent Publisher Book Award (IPPY) bronze medal in the category of Current Events.

== Literary production ==
Braverman's first monograph, House Demolitions in East Jerusalem: 'Illegality' and Resistance (The Tami Steinmetz Center for Peace Research, 2006, Hebrew), focuses on the contribution of planning laws and regulations applied in East Jerusalem toward discriminatory practices. Her second monograph, Planted Flags: Trees, Land, and Law in Israel/Palestine (Cambridge University Press, 2009), describes land and identity struggles in Israel/Palestine through the acts of planting and uprooting trees.

For Braverman's third book, Zooland: The Institution of Captivity (Stanford University Press, 2012), she conducted interviews with zoo managers and administrators, as well as animal activists, to write an ethnography of zoo administration. Donna Haraway calls Zooland, "Beautifully written, finely researched, [and] astutely argued, . . . offer[ing] a wealth of stories, data, and views to understand the potent work of zoos and their life-propagating messiness, astonishing technologies, and detailed ordering of their captive subjects deemed wild." Stephen Cave at Financial Times notes Zooland "illustrates how there is nothing natural about the lives of zoo animals."

Braverman's monograph, Coral Whisperers: Scientists on the Brink (University of California Press, 2018), contains interviews with more than 100 marine biologists about coral scientists' attempts to save corals and their marine ecosystems. Shortly after its publication, Coral Whisperers garnered considerable attention. Environmental journalist Elizabeth Kolbert featured it in her discussion about the existential crisis of our time in the New Yorker, and filmmaker and historian Iain McCalman reviewed it in the May 2019 issue of The Times Literary Supplement.

Braverman has published numerous essays on law, space, and the politics of nature, including "The Tree is the Enemy Soldier" in Law and Society Review (2008), "Civilized Borders" in Antipode (2011), "Uprooting Identities" in PoLAR (2010), "Looking at Zoos" in Cultural Studies (2011), "Passing the Sniff Test" in Buffalo Law Review (2013), and "Animal Frontiers: A Tale of Three Zoos in Israel/Palestine" in Cultural Critique (2013). Recent essays include "Wild Legalities: Animals and Settler Colonialism in Palestine/Israel" in PoLAR (2021), and "Environmental justice, settler colonialism, and more-than-humans in the occupied West Bank: An introduction" for a special issue of Environment and Planning E: Nature and Space (2021), "provid[ing] a first-of-its kind attempt to examine environmental injustices in the occupied West Bank through interdisciplinary perspectives, pointing to the broader settler colonial and neoliberal contexts within which they occur and to their more-than-human implications."

== Notable publications ==
- Settling nature: the conservation regime in Palestine-Israel (University of Minnesota Press, 2023)
- Zoo Veterinarians: Governing Care on a Diseased Planet (Routledge, 2020)
- Blue Legalities: The Laws and Life of the Sea, Irus Braverman and Elizabeth Johnson (eds.)(Duke University Press, 2020)
- Coral Whisperers: Scientists on the Brink (University of California Press, 2018)
- Wild Life: The Institution of Nature (Stanford University Press, 2015)
- The Expanding Spaces of Law: A Timely Legal Geography, Irus Braverman, Nicholas Blomley, David Delaney & Alexandre (Sandy) Kedar (eds.) (Stanford University Press, 2014)
- Zooland: The Institution of Captivity (Stanford University Press, 2012)
- Planted Flags: Trees, Land, and Law in Israel/Palestine (Cambridge University Press, 2009)
- House Demolitions in East Jerusalem: 'Illegality' and Resistance (The Tami Steinmetz Center for Peace Research, 2006, Hebrew)
