= Roger Zetter =

Professor of Refugee Studies

Roger Zetter is Emeritus Professor of Refugee Studies, former Director of the Refugee Studies Centre at University of Oxford and the founding editor of the Journal of Refugee Studies (a position held until 2001), published by Oxford University Press. His teaching, research, publications and consultancy on forced displacement, refugee and humanitarian affairs include all stages of the refugee and displacement cycle.

== Education and career ==
Following degrees from the University of Cambridge and University of Nottingham, Zetter completed his DPhil at the Institute of Development Studies, University of Sussex.

Zetter has been a consultant to many international organisations including UNHCR, UNDP, UNFPA, UNHABITAT, ILO, International Organization for Migration, IFRC, World Bank, OXFAM and Swiss Agency for Development and Cooperation, with research having been funded by ESRC, MacArthur Foundation, Joseph Rowntree Foundation, Paul Hamlyn Foundation and MPI.

== Selected publications ==
- Zetter, R., Sigona, N. & Bloch, A. 2014. Sans Papiers: The Social and Economic Lives of Young Undocumented Migrants. Pluto Press. ISBN 9780745333908.
- Zetter, R. & Watson, G. B. 2006. Designing Sustainable Cities in the Developing World. Routledge. ISBN 9781138254893.
- Zetter, R. & Ward, P. 2004. Assessment Of The Impact Of Asylum Policies In Europe 1990-2000. Diane Pub Co. ISBN 9780756740504.
- Zetter, R. & Hamza, M. 2004. Market Economy and Urban Change: Impacts in the Developing World. Routledge. ISBN 9781853837845.
- Zetter, R. & White, R. 2003. Planning in Cities: Sustainability and Growth in the Developing World. Practical Action. ISBN 9781853395437.
