= Nicholas Blomley =

British-Canadian geographer

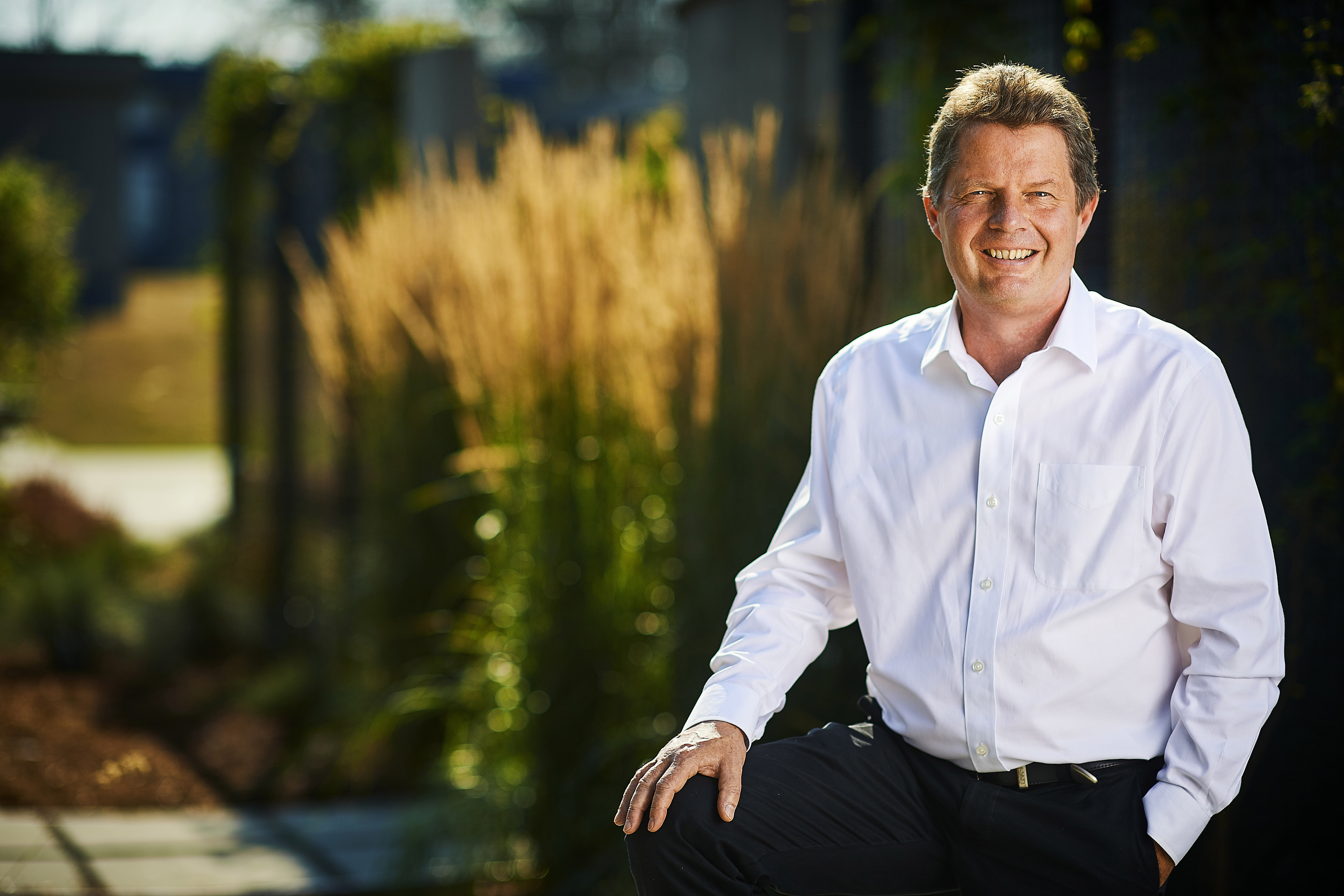
- Blomley in 2017
- Born: 1962; Reading, Berkshire, United Kingdom

Academic background
- Education: PhD, Geography, University of Bristol
- Thesis: Retail law at the urban and national levels: Geographical aspects of the operation and possible amendment of the Shops Act (1950). (1986)

Academic work
- Discipline: Geography
- Sub-discipline: legal geography
- Institutions: University of California, Los Angeles; Boston University; Simon Fraser University

Nicholas K. Blomley FRSC (born 1962) is a British-Canadian legal geographer. He is a Professor and former Chair of Geography at Simon Fraser University.

== Career ==
Blomley worked briefly in the Department of Geography at University of California, Los Angeles, and Boston University, before joining the faculty of Geography at Simon Fraser University (SFU) in 1989 as a temporary replacement for a professor. He ended up impressing the department and was hired full-time.

In 1994, Blomley published "Law, Space, and the Geographies of Power" through the Guilford Press. This book examined the geographies of law through critical theory. In 1997, Blomley began to develop a computerized geographical information system with data on Vancouver's downtown eastside land market as a way to combat gentrification. The next year, he petitioned then University president Jack Blaney to review the university's decision regarding support for criminology graduate student Russel Ogden, apologize, and pay him full compensation for his court appearances. In 2001, he co-edited "The Legal Geographies Reader" alongside Richard Thompson Ford and David Delaney. The next year he sat on the Graduate Urban Studies Steering Committee, which introduced SFU's inaugural graduate diploma in urban studies.

Between May 2003 to May 2007, Blomley helped referee manuscripts for the Southeastern Geographer journal. In 2004, Blomley published "Unsettling the City" through Routledge. The book focused on how problems facing gentrification and Indigenous land claims are generated through modern concepts of property and ownership. In 2010, he published " Rights of Passage: Sidewalks and the Regulation of Public Flow." The book would go on to win the Hart Socio-Legal Studies Association book prize. During the 2011–12 academic year, Blomley sat on the Graduate Student Activity Committee of the Law and Society Association. He was also promoted to chair of the geography department.

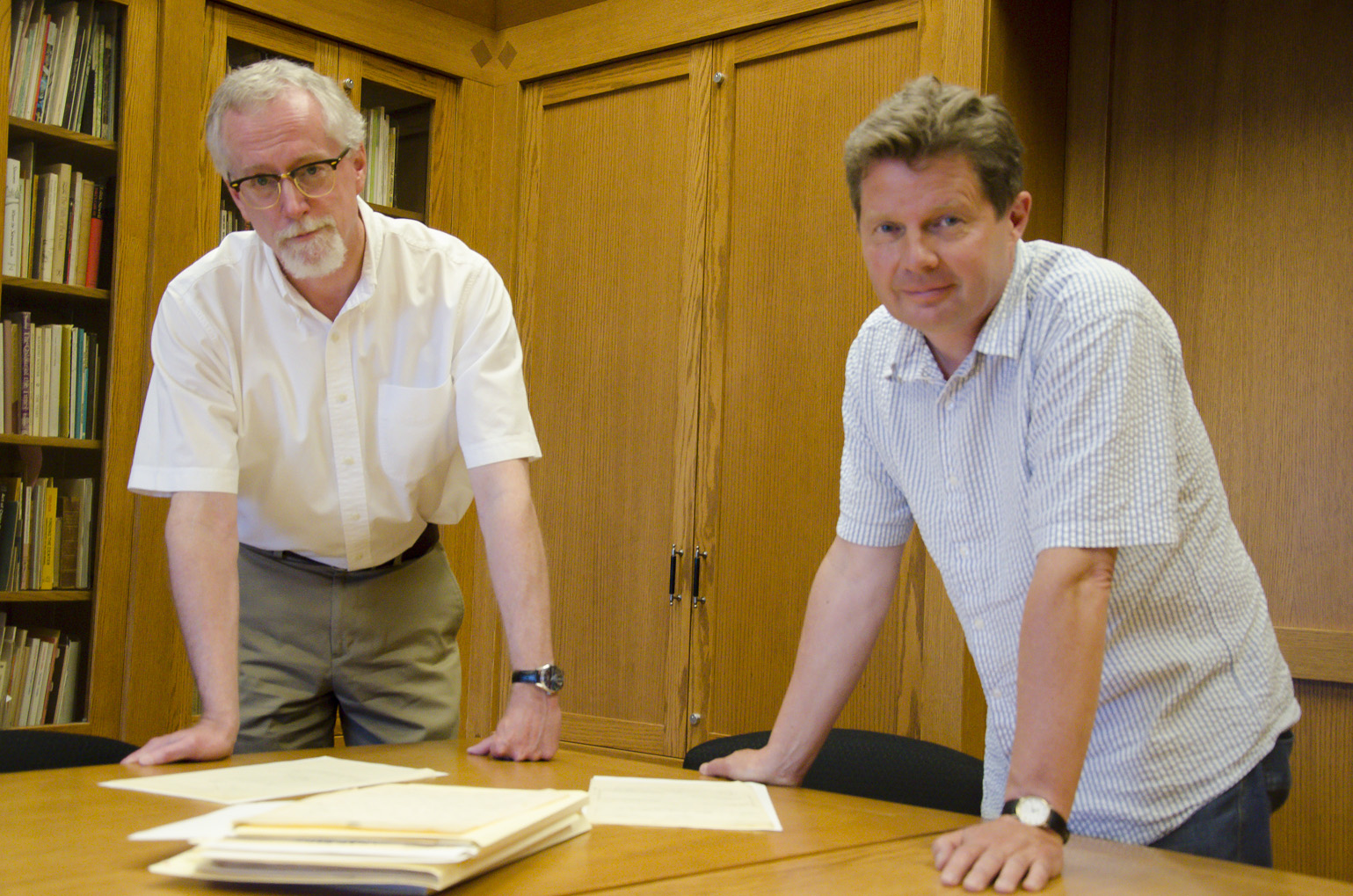
Blomley and Brian Owen in 2014

The next year, Blomley sat on the Editorial Advisory Board for the Territory, Politics, Governance Journal. In 2017, Blomley was elected a Fellow of the Royal Society of Canada for his research in legal geography.

In 2018, Blomley, Natalia Perez, and Andy Yan began a pilot study on evictions in the private rental housing market in Metro Vancouver. The study found that Maple Ridge had the highest number of tenant disputes that more than doubled the Metro average. As well, his paper " Land use, planning, and the "difficult character of property" was shortlisted for the AESOP Best Published Paper Award 2018. The next year, he sat on the Graduate Studies Committee and on the executive board of the Social Sciences and Humanities Research Council funded research project "Landscapes of Injustice" He was also selected to sit on the Application and Nomination Review Committee for the Pierre Elliott Trudeau Foundation. and awarded a grant for two research projects.
