= Cheryl Rubenberg =

American scholar and writer (1946-2017)

- Born: January 3, 1946; Pennsylvania
- Died: 16 June 2017 (aged 71)
- Citizenship: USA
- Education: Hunter College; Johns Hopkins University; University of Miami
- Occupations: writer and researcher

Cheryl A. Rubenberg (January 3, 1946 – 16 June 2017) was a writer and researcher specializing in the Middle East, formerly an associate professor in the department of political science at Florida International University.

== Life ==
Born in Pennsylvania, Rubenberg specialized in political science and obtained her B.A. at Hunter College, and then earned an M.A. in international relations at Johns Hopkins University. The latter topic was the object of her Ph.D.(1979) at the University of Miami. Soon after, she joined the political science faculty at Florida International University. Her initial research focus was on Latin America where her attention was drawn to Israel's foreign policy outreach and military assistance in Latin America, particularly in Guatemala. Her interest in the Israeli Palestinian conflict arose out of a visit she made to a Palestinian Refugee Camp in Beirut. In 1989 she moved to the Gaza Strip for a year, together with her husband, Dr. Martin Rubenberg, she teaching English, while her husband volunteered to work as an oncologist at a nearby hospital. They raised funds to enable four students to study at the University of Calgary, and adopted another, Ayman Wishah, after hosting him while he studied forensic and clinical psychology at Florida Atlantic University.

Rubenberg was denied full professorship because of her position regarding Palestinians and Israel, and resigned to become an independent scholar. Her lectures were boycotted, her husband's medical practice suffered and both she and her husband were shunned at their local synagogue, according to her obituary, for the same reason.

Her husband Marty predeceased her, dying in June 2016.

== Works ==
She was the author of several books about the Israeli–Palestinian conflict, including Israel and the American National Interest (1989), Palestinian Women: Patriarchy and Resistance in the West Bank (2001), and The Palestinians in Search of a Just Peace (2003). She was also the editor of the Encyclopedia of the Israeli–Palestinian Conflict (2007).

Rubenberg formerly served on the board of advisors of "Deir Yassin Remembered," an organization founded to commemorate the 1948 Deir Yassin Massacre.

== Works ==
- Palestine Liberation Organization: Its Institutional Infrastructure. Belmont, MA: Institute of Arab Studies, (IAS monograph series), 1983. ISBN 0-912031-00-X
- Israel and the American National Interest: A Critical Examination. University of Illinois Press, 1986, reprint 1989. ISBN 978-0-252-06074-8
- The United States, Israel, and Guatemala: Interests and Conflicts. Latin American and Caribbean Center, Florida International University. Dialogues), 1988.
- With Abbas Alnasrawi. Consistency of US Foreign Policy: The Gulf War and the Iran–Contra Affair. AAUG Monograph Series, No 23, 1989.
- Palestinian Women: Patriarchy and Resistance in the West Bank. Lynne Rienner Publishers, 2001. ISBN 978-1-555-87956-3
- The Palestinians: In Search of a Just Peace. Lynne Rienner Publishers Inc, 2003. ISBN 978-1-588-262257
- (ed.) Encyclopedia of the Israeli–Palestinian Conflict. 3 volumes. Lynne Rienner Publishers, 2010. ISBN 1-58826-686-9
