= Ethnic profiling in Israel =

Application of systematic discrimination

An extensive system of racial profiling is used in or by Israel, primarily by Israeli security forces. Racial profiling is the act of suspecting or targeting a person of a certain race on the basis of observed characteristics or behavior, rather than on individual suspicion. Bio-social profiling has been seen as "integral to the Israeli security apparatus".

== Historical background ==
On the signing of the 1949 Armistice Agreements between Israel and other belligerents to the 1948 Arab–Israeli War, Israel, in a contentious measure, decided to keep in place the military rule that had prevailed during hostilities. The authorities of Mandatory Palestine had already established a functional system of non-statutory regulations regarding residence permits which Israel had inherited and could use without passing further legislation.

The IDF opposed it, being of the view that, given the devastation and shock affecting the defeated Palestinian communities, the maintenance of such provisions was no longer necessary, since, in their view, the civil police force could handle the application of the existing emergency regulations. Ministers such as Bechor Shitrit also opposed the maintenance of martial law to govern the Palestinians as conflicting with the article guaranteeing the equality of all citizens set forth in the Israeli Declaration of Independence: the involvement of low-level officers in looting, theft, rape and murder would, he thought, also complicate matters. On deliberation, it was decided to suspend military law only in mixed cities with a Jewish presence, while applying it elsewhere as the most effective measure for depopulating Arab villages, impeding Palestinians from returning to their villages and home, and for assisting Jewish immigrants to settle and displace them. It was the permit system that formed part of the body of non-statutory regulations, enforced from the earliest days by the new-found military, that, in Shira Robinson's view, 'created a culture of racial profiling and served to criminalize the Palestinian public at large'.

The measures were implemented quickly, with patrols of both the military and border police establishing fixed and flying checkpoints and stopping anyone with an 'Arab appearance' to examine their papers. Such profiling became vexatious for the Yemenite Jews in Israel, who were often taken to be Arabs. The permits issued stipulated strictly the time given for any Palestinian moving in the country and the routes permitted. Officers were rewarded if they achieved compliance with the figures set forth in a monthly quota system for arresting a given number of Palestinians halted by such procedures and caught out in permit infractions. The overwhelming majority of those arrested, be they Palestinians returning late for missing a bus, peasants retrieving flocks that had wandered from their set pastures, old men overstaying a permit during an evening visit to a mosque, women taking buses to markets to sell produce, were tried not in civil tribunals, but in military courts. Down to 1967, it has been estimated that 95% of all convictions by Israel's military tribunals regarded Palestinians rounded up for such permit infractions or for trespassing.

Shortly after the Kafr Qasim massacre in 1956, Israel began a Jewish settlement project on land expropriated from Palestinians on the hill above the Galilee town of Nazareth designed to "swallow up" the predominantly Palestinian village below. Local activists, fearing they would become residents of a 'new Johannesburg' but also reacting to the deaths of 22 Palestinian children from land mines and military exercises nearby, protested that the plans were based on racial grounds. Some concessions were made in reducing the severity of the permit system, which was claimed to regulate movements along territorial rather than racial lines, but widespread protests continued and when, in 1958, two Palestinians were tried for entering Safad, which was freely accessible to tourists and Jews, the local police chief admitted under interrogation that entry into this so-called "closed zone" was determined by a less visible racial profiling system designed to bar only Palestinians.

== At Ben Gurion Airport ==
Israel first introduced a new set of protocols for profiling potential terrorists for airport passenger screening after the hijacking of an El Al plane on 23 July 1968, and these have persisted down to the present day (2012). The measures have proved highly effective, and a high percentage of respondents, both Jewish and Arab have affirmed that they feel safer with such checks in place.

In 1972, terrorists from the Japanese Red Army launched an attack that led to the deaths of at least 24 people at Ben Gurion Airport. Since then, security at the airport has relied on a number of fundamentals, including a heavy focus on what Raphael Ron, former director of security at Ben Gurion, terms the "human factor", which he generalized as "the inescapable fact that terrorist attacks are carried out by people who can be found and stopped by an effective security methodology." As part of its focus on this so-called "human factor," Israeli security officers interrogate travelers using racial profiling, singling out those who appear to be Arab based on name or physical appearance. Additionally, all passengers, including those who do not appear to be of Arab descent, are questioned as to why they are traveling to Israel, followed by several general questions about the trip in order to search for inconsistencies.

As of 2007, according to Boaz Ganor, it appeared that Israel had not undertaken any known empirical studies on the efficacy of the technique of racial profiling. In the spring of 2008, Israel's Attorney General Menachem Mazuz, responded to complaints from human rights groups which had threatened to take to the courts the issue of passenger screening and security checks of non-Jews before the courts. He directed the airport authority to implement a policy of 'visible equality' and thereby put an end to the practice, regarding as humiliating, of racial profiling, in particular of Palestinian Israelis which had been in place for decades. The vetting procedures were duly modified but, according to Jonathan Cook, while the prior use of coloured stickers was replaced by uniform white stickers for all passengers, airport security officials simply wrote over the stickers with a numbering system that conserved the distinctions.

Israel does not admit that it employs profiling based on ethnic criteria, but a 2012 empirical study based on interviews with 918 passengers, evenly covering 308 Israeli Jews, 306 Palestinian Israelis, and 304 non-Israelis found strong indications suggesting that it does so. According to Ariel Merari, an Israeli terrorism expert and retired professor of psychology "It's foolishness not to use profiles when you know that most terrorists come from certain ethnic groups and certain age groups"; he notes further that a terrorist on an airplane "is likely to be Muslim and young", and argues that the goal of preventing numerous casualties "justifies inconveniencing a certain ethnic group."

In a 2010 book on Israel's airport screening, Reg Whitaker notes 'neutral scientific impartiality' in screening to be difficult: 'it would be delusional to expect that any security screening process for Israel could escape the constraints of national ideology'. The result has been, in his view, that rather than seeking anomalous behavior ticks as risk identifiers, the Israeli system reflects the larger structural nature of Israel as a Jewish state, with 'ethnic and religious profiling' making up the core of the vetting. While the systems developed to profile behavior along ethnic and religious lines have proved functional, they are also, Whitaker asserts, intrinsically discriminatory and repugnant to human rights.

Amotz Brandes, a former intelligence officer in the Israeli Defense Forces and a security agent and profiler at El Al Airlines, has said that Israeli security almost exclusively profiled Arabs and Muslims until the 1972 airport massacre, and that as a result of that massacre, Israel began to use threat-based profiling in addition to racial profiling at Ben Gurion Airport.

Many passengers have complained of the discrimination they claim to have suffered on entering Israel from intrusive searches based upon suspicion related to their Arab or Palestinian identity, or association with such people. Israeli Arabs are included in the terror profile notwithstanding the fact that only one of the 102 terrorists involved in attacks on Israeli aviation over the period 1968-2010 came from that background.

== In other contexts ==
Airport security is not the only area where Israel employs techniques of ethnic profiling. The military governance of the Palestinian territories uses these methods extensively, and it has been argued that, with regard to the administration of Palestinians, 'Profiling is its methodological procedure.' The gamut of informal and formal control and monitoring techniques used by Israel to profile and control what it considers a 'dangerous population' in the occupied territories has led Ilan Pappé to define it as a Mukhabarat state, a term usually applied to neighbouring Arab countries, meaning an 'intelligence surveillance state'

The Israeli Security Forces use racial profiling at military checkpoints and during some of the duties they perform. In August 2017 Haaretz reported that security guards working for a company which provides security at Tel Aviv's Central Bus Station said they were instructed to demand ID from people who look Arab and detain those who do not have an ID with them.

Roni Alsheikh, the then head of the Israel Police, stated in 2016 that "All over the world it is proven that migrants are more involved in crime than others... This also goes for Arabs… and also in east Jerusalem."

Scholars in Canada have recently written that:

"Israel has marketed itself as a global expert in combating the 'Islamic' or 'Arab' terrorism held to be responsible for the type of security threats associated with the 9/11 attacks, and with an intensification of profiling based on the techniques and experiences of the conflict zone of Israel/Palestine. This is despite the reality that what might be labelled terrorist attacks—such as the one by an anti-Muslim activist that took the lives of 91 victims in Oslo and Utoya Island in Norway in July, 2011—often in fact defy the efficacy of racial profiling."

== Emulation in other countries ==
Post 9/11, countries have emulated Israeli security profiling techniques that are widely regarded as effective, necessary, and successful in preventing airplane hijacking or bombing. Some critics claim that there has been an 'Israelization of surveillance' and the 'Palestinianization of the racial contracts of liberal democracies.'

"Israeli-style profiling" started in the U.S. in the wake of 11 September 2001, when Boston's Logan airport hired the former director of security at Tel Aviv's Ben Gurion airport. Dave McIntyre of the Integrative Center for Homeland Security said with regard to Israeli predictive profiling that the "US Secretary of Homeland Security returned from a security tour of Israel and pledged to adopt some of their techniques to make us all safer." Former Arkansas governor and two-time presidential candidate Mike Huckabee has stated: "What the Israelis do - and I've flown on El Al about a dozen times to Israel - what they do is the way it ought to be done". Tea Party member Allen West has stated: "I traveled to Israel, and I tell you what... They have very good procedures and you don't have to go through all of these very draconian practices." Donald Trump, the former President of the United States, repeatedly called for the Transportation Security Administration (TSA) to adopt Israeli profiling methods, including racial profiling.

== See also ==
- Airport racial profiling in the United States
- Israel and apartheid
