= Immaculate Conception High School =

Immaculate Conception High School may refer to:

== Jamaica ==
- Immaculate Conception High School (Jamaica)

== United States ==
- IC Catholic Prep (Elmhurst, Illinois), Elmhurst, Illinois
- Immaculate Conception Ukrainian Catholic High School, Warren, Michigan
- Immaculate Conception High School (Massachusetts), Revere, Massachusetts
- Immaculate Conception High School (Mississippi), Clarksdale, Mississippi
- Immaculate Conception High School (Lodi, New Jersey), Lodi, New Jersey
- Immaculate Conception High School (Montclair, New Jersey), Montclair, New Jersey
- Immaculate Conception High School (Celina, Ohio), Celina, Ohio
- Immaculate Conception High School (Tennessee), Memphis, Tennessee
