= Israeli Military Order 1650 =

Israeli Military Order Regarding the Entry and Presence of Persons in the West Bank

Military order 1650 (officially, Order regarding Prevention of Infiltration (Amendment No. 2) (Judea and Samaria) (No. 1650) 5769-2009) is an Israeli military order issued on 13 October 2009. It is an amendment to Military Order No. 329, "Order Regarding Prevention of Infiltration", and significantly expands the definition of 'infiltrator' such that any person in the West Bank could fall under the scope of the definition, and be subject to arrest or deportation by the Israel Defense Forces (IDF) without judicial review. The order was signed by Gadi Shamni, Major General and commander of IDF Forces in the Judea and Samaria Area.

The order modifies the 1969 definition of 'infiltrator' to encompass anyone who enters the West Bank illegally, as well as anyone, "who is present in the Area and does not lawfully hold a permit." The original 1969 definition of 'infiltrator' applied only to those who entered Israel illegally after passing through 'enemy states' (Jordan, Egypt, Lebanon, and Syria). The military order does not clarify what kind of permit is required, and thus leaves it open for the Israeli authorities in the West Bank to interpret it. According to Amnesty International, those considered to be 'infiltrators' can be deported to other states, forcibly transferred to the Gaza Strip, or face criminal charges. This could include Palestinians whose address is recorded as being the Gaza Strip, even if they live in or were born in the West Bank.

The military order was first used on 21 April 2010 when Israel authorities deported a Palestinian prisoner to the Gaza Strip after he was released following a nine-year prison sentence.

== Criticism ==
On 21 April 2010, the South African government expressed "the greatest concern" over the order, saying it has a broad definition of "infiltrator" and unclear terms as to which permits would allow a person to reside in the West Bank, as well as how valid residency might be proven. The South African government said the terms of the order are "reminiscent of pass laws under apartheid South Africa".

Richard Falk, the United Nations Special Rapporteur "on the situation of human rights in Palestinian territories occupied since 1967", warned that the order may violate international law and the Fourth Geneva Convention.

Various human rights organizations have criticized the order. Dalia Kerstein, director of the Israel-based HaMoked, requested a delay in implementing the order because of its drastic effect on human rights. The Euro-Mediterranean Human Rights Network "condemns and demands the immediate annulment of Israeli Military Orders 1649 'Order regarding Security provisions' and 1650 'Order regarding Prevention of Infiltration'". Amnesty International worried that order 1650 "could facilitate the expulsion of Palestinians from the occupied West Bank."

== See also ==
- Prevention of Infiltration Law
