= Michael G. Kagan =

American academic, lawyer and activist

Michael Kagan is an American academic and immigrant rights lawyer. He is Professor of Law at the University of Nevada, Las Vegas. He is the director of the UNLV Immigration Clinic, which specializes in deportation defense, including of unaccompanied children.

Kagan played a leading role in the establishment of refugee legal aid programs that assist asylum-seekers applying for refugee status determination through the UN refugee agency. He helped to found or develop Africa Middle East Refugee Assistance (AMERA) in Egypt, and Asylum Access, which is based in the United States. He also became a leading campaigner for reforms in the way the UN conducts refugee status determination, and started the website RSDWatch.org. Kagan completed his J.D. degree at the University of Michigan. Kagan's experiences are International Human Rights Law, Criminal and also Immigration law, and the First Amendment. Michael Kagan has also done some research and written work on legal matters.
