= Integrative Center for Homeland Security =

The Integrative Center for Homeland Security (ICHS) at Texas A&M University in College Station, Texas is an office funded by the Vice President for Research created to explore educational, research, and outreach needs in the field of homeland security. The ICHS is directed by David McIntyre. Its goal is to promote complete and well-rounded education in policy related homeland security issues.

== Research ==
ICHS has developed a taxonomy for homeland security, collecting every major idea, term, and issue in homeland security and organizing them into a framework of fewer than 20 headings. This taxonomy has been cross checked against similar documents from NORTHCOM, the Naval Postgraduate School and DHS and forms the foundation of the center's research tool named TEX (Taxonomy for Education and exploration), which consists of one page summaries and links to more than 2500 key studies, documents, and sources on homeland security issues (focused primarily on policy).

== Education ==
Texas A&M offers a Graduate Certificate in Homeland Security through the George Bush School of Government and Public Service. The certificate program offers a total of ten courses. ICHS was recently asked to take the lead in developing a Master of Science in Homeland Security degree. It was approved by the State of Texas in 2009, and is currently offered as a course. The program includes a core of common policy courses, with electives concentrated in various departments, including Agriculture, the Bush School, Veterinary Medicine, Public Health, Geography, General Studies, Engineering, Architecture, and Urban Planning, to provide a tailored focus according to student interests.

== Outreach ==
=== Homeland Security Lecture Series ===
ICHS hosts a Presidential Library lecture series focusing on homeland security that meets monthly at the George Bush Presidential Library and Museum. Past speakers include Ruth A. David (CEO, ANSER & President's Homeland Security Advisory Council Member), Charles Rodriguez (Adjutant General, Texas State Guard), Jim Turner (former US Congressman), Klaus-Peter Gottwald (Deputy Chief of Mission, German Embassy to the US), Tom Matthews (Department of Defense), Peter Macintyre (Toronto EMS), Ken Senser (Senior VP for Global Security, Wal-Mart), John Shroder (University of Nebraska at Omaha, GIS and Afghanistan geography expert), and Rolf Mowatt-Larssen (Director of Intelligence & Counterintelligence, United States Department of Energy).

=== Radio show ===
McIntyre (Director, ICHS) and Randy Larsen host "Homeland Security Inside and Out," a weekly one hour radio program on NPR featuring guests from inside and outside the beltway of Washington, D.C. Past radio shows, are categorized and archived for use in policy research and educational programs. Additionally, McIntyre hosts "Just a Minute...for Homeland Security," a weekly three-minute short program that tackles the issue of homeland security issues.
