= Journal of Refugee Studies =

- Discipline: Migration studies
- Language: English
- Edited by: Simon Turner & Megan Bradley

Publication details
- History: 1988–present
- Publisher: Oxford University Press (United Kingdom)
- Frequency: Quarterly
- Impact factor: 2.966 (2021)

Standard abbreviations
- ISO 4: J. Refug. Stud.

Indexing
- ISSN: 0951-6328
- LCCN: 91642362

Links
- Journal homepage; Online archive

The Journal of Refugee Studies is a quarterly peer-reviewed academic journal publishing research on forced migration. It was established in 1988 by the Refugee Studies Centre at the University of Oxford, with its first issue published that May. It is published by Oxford University Press in association with the Refugee Studies Centre. The editors-in-chief are Simon Turner and Megan Bradley. According to the Journal Citation Reports, the journal has a 2021 impact factor of 2.966, ranking it 10th out of 20 journals in the category "Ethnic Studies" and 16th out of 29 in the category "Demography". The journal provides a forum for exploration of the complex issue of forced migration and local, national, regional and international responses.
