= HaMoked =

Israeli human rights organization

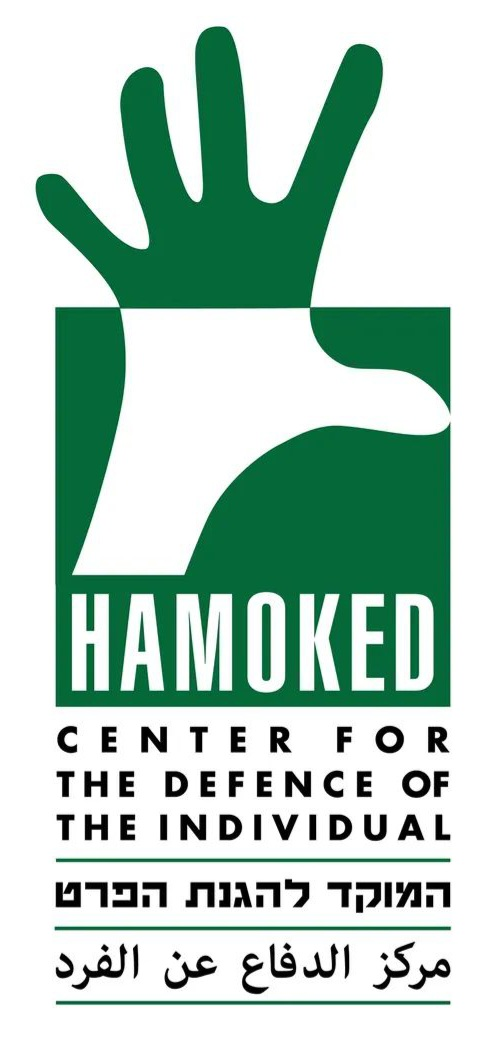
- Founded: 1988; 38 years ago
- Type: Non-profit; NGO
- Purpose: enforcing international human rights law and international humanitarian law
- Region served: Israel and the Palestinian territories
- Key people: Lotte Salzberger
- Employees: 23 (both Israeli and Palestinian)
- Website: hamoked.org.il

HaMoked (Hebrew: המוקד, lit. 'the Center'; transcribed into Arabic: هموكيد), full legal name Center for the Defence of the Individual (Hebrew: המוקד להגנת הפרט, romanized: HaMoked LaHaganat HaPrat; Arabic: مركز الدفاع عن الفرد, romanized: Markaz ad-Difāʿ ʿani l-Fard), is an Israel-based human rights organization founded by Dr. Lotte Salzberger with the stated aim of assisting "Palestinians subjected to the Israeli occupation which causes severe and ongoing violation of their rights." HaMoked states that it works for "the enforcement of the standards and values of international human rights and humanitarian law".

== Objectives ==
HaMoked's aims, as registered with Israel's Registrar of Non-profit Organizations, are to: "Provide assistance to persons who have fallen victim to acts of violence, abuse or deprivation of basic rights by governmental authorities (including local government), especially those needing assistance in conveying their complaints to these authorities, and also to protect basic rights in any other manner, including application to legal instances and among them – petitions to the Supreme Court of Israel in its capacity as High Court of Justice, whether in the name of an individual who claims that his basic right was harmed and whether as a "friend of the court".

== Activities ==
As Palestinians from the West Bank, Gaza Strip and East Jerusalem turned to HaMoked with additional issues, the organization expanded its activities to handle human rights violations in other spheres as well. These include Detainee Rights; Residency Rights and Family Unification; Freedom of Movement; Violence by security forces and settlers toward Palestinians; and Punitive House Demolition.

HaMoked also operates an Emergency Human Rights Hotline in order to attempt to offer real time solutions by working vis-a-vis relevant authorities in the field. Emergency situations include those arising from restrictions on movement within the territories; from violence; from delays in the evacuation of the injured, the sick, and women in labor; and from the blockage of humanitarian aid such as food, medicine and water.

HaMoked provide case commentaries in the "Court Watch" section of their website where they present "judicial critiques of judgment rendered by the HCJ and other Courts, in light of human rights standards."

In 2006, HaMoked filed a lawsuit at the Jerusalem Magistrate's Court on behalf of a resident of East Jerusalem against the State of Israel for "alleged repeated arrests by the police and Shin Bet security service, unnecessary delays at checkpoints and abusive interrogations between 1996–1999". The state attorney from the Tel Aviv prosecutor's office for civil matters submitted an official statement to the court that accused HaMoked and B'Tselem of being organizations that "undermine the existence" of Israel, "besmirch" Israel and its security forces, and "cause it damage in the world" adding that HaMoked "does not deal with 'defending human rights' as it claims, but instead with defending the rights of Palestinians only" and that its "self-presentation as 'a human rights organization' has no basis in reality and is designed to mislead". HaMoked's director filed a complaint with the Attorney General and said that the state's document contained "unbridled attacks" on both organizations and on "the very notion of defending the human rights of Palestinians" adding that "Attacks by the state on human rights organizations active in it and on the sheer legitimacy of their existence pose a serious threat to democratic rule". HaMoked demanded that a revised statement be filed by the state. The state attorney's statements received support from Gerald M. Steinberg of NGO Monitor and were criticized by Israeli historian and writer Tom Segev, the New Israel Fund, the Association for Civil Rights in Israel and Israeli politician Zehava Gal-On. Israel's State Prosecutor's Office dissociated itself from the state attorney's comments, and said they "reflect neither the prosecution's position nor the position of the state, and were not authorized" and that the "state's position has been and continues to be that HaMoked: Center for the Defense of the Individual and the B'Tselem organization are human rights organizations". They confirmed that what they described as "inappropriate" comments would be excised and a revised version would be submitted to the court.

In March 2010, HaMoked was one of ten human rights organizations that co-signed a letter to Israeli Defense Minister Ehud Barak. The letter demanded a delay to the implementation of military orders, with prevention of infiltration and security provisions that, according to the NGO, authorized the Israeli army to deport Palestinian residents from the West Bank if they do not have an Israeli permit. An Israeli permit is a new requirement for the majority of Palestinians in the West Bank. Military Order No. 1650 is an amendment to a 1969 military law intended to deal with infiltration from neighboring Arab countries. According to the NGO, a Palestinian without a permit will be classified as an "infiltrator". Israeli security sources have stated that the new edict is designed to allow for judicial oversight of the expulsion of an individual under the order.

In 2011, following a request submitted by HaMoked under Israel's Freedom of Information Law, the legal advisor for the Justice Ministry's office in the West Bank provided a document that described a covert procedure that Israel used to cancel the residency status of 140,000 Palestinian residents of the West Bank who traveled abroad such as students who studied at foreign universities and people who migrated internationally for work. The procedure was used from the 1967 occupation of the West Bank until the Oslo Accords were signed in 1994. Coordinator of Government Activities in the Territories between 1991 and 1995, Daniel Rothschild, said he was not aware of the procedure and that "one may infer that neither were residents of the occupied territories". HaMoked said that "mass withdrawal of residency rights from tens of thousands of West Bank residents, tantamount to permanent exile from their homeland, remains an illegitimate demographic policy and a grave violation of international law." According to organization, the number of Palestinians from the Gaza Strip who lost their residency rights is unknown.

In the Gaza war, HaMoked filed with the military for the status of some 900 Palestinians missing from the besieged Gaza Strip.

== Funding ==
According to the JTA, HaMoked received US$300,000 from the Ford Foundation in 2002. HaMoked received "at least 8,500,000 NIS in European funding" from 2006 to 2009. According to a 2011 article in The Forward, HaMoked received, in 2009, $300,000 from the "Ramallah-based NGO Development Center (NDC)" which in turn, had received funding from the "Geneva-headquartered Welfare Association". In 2010, HaMoked also received 25,000 Euros from the Finnish government.

== Criticism ==
Gerald M. Steinberg has criticized Hamoked that it does not promote dialogue between Israelis and Palestinians by publishing political statements. Israel's Justice Minister, Ayelet Shaked, said that HaMoked engages in "apartheid rhetoric" and supports the Boycott, Divestment and Sanctions, which she describes as anti-Israel.

== See also ==
- Arab–Israeli peace projects
- B'Tselem
- Bimkom
- Bustan
- Arab–Israeli conflict
