= Jan Nederveen Pieterse =

Dutch-born scholar

Jan Nederveen Pieterse is a Dutch sociologist and globalization scholar whose work spans global studies, development studies, political economy, cultural studies, and social theory. He served as Distinguished Professor of Global Studies and Sociology at the University of California, Santa Barbara (UCSB) from 2009 to 2026 and held the Duncan and Suzanne Mellichamp Chair from 2009 to 2021.

He is known for his scholarship on globalization, cultural hybridity, development theory, imperialism, and emerging multipolar world orders. His publications have influenced debates on global political economy, development, multiculturalism, and comparative civilizations.

Nederveen Pieterse has authored sixteen books, edited or co-edited more than fifteen volumes, and published several hundred scholarly articles and book chapters. His books and articles have been translated into many languages including Arabic, Chinese, Danish, French, German, Italian, Japanese, Korean, Persian, Portuguese, Spanish and Ukrainian. More than 23,000 Google Scholar citations (2026) make him one of the most cited scholars in globalization studies.

== Early life and education ==
Nederveen Pieterse studied cultural anthropology at the University of Amsterdam, where he received his bachelor's and master's degrees. He completed a PhD in Social Science at the University of Nijmegen in 1988. His doctoral work combined sociology, anthropology, and political economy, themes that would characterize much of his later scholarship, including globalization, postcolonialism, development, and cultural interaction.

== Academic career ==
Nederveen Pieterse began his academic career at the University of Amsterdam before serving at the University of Cape Coast in Ghana during 1978-1981. His experience in West Africa contributed significantly to his later work on development studies.

After Ghana he moved to New York State University, Binghamton from 1981 to 1983 and studied world system studies with Immanuel Wallerstein and Giovanni Arrighi and development studies with James Petras.

From 1990 to 2001 he was associate professor at the International Institute of Social Studies in The Hague, where he also served as director of research. He became internationally known for his writings on development, global inequality, and humanitarian intervention. Between 1997 and 1999 he also held a part-time appointment at the University of Freiburg in Germany.

In 2001 Nederveen Pieterse joined the University of Illinois Urbana–Champaign, where he remained until 2009 as professor of sociology and globalization studies. In 2009 he accepted an appointment as Duncan and Suzanne Mellichamp Professor of Global Studies and Sociology at the University of California, Santa Barbara. He simultaneously held an appointment at Maastricht University from 2009 to 2011.

During 2014–2015 he served as Tun Daim Pok Rafeah Research Chair at the National University of Malaysia, leading a team of scholars conducting comparative research on development studies in Northeast Asia and Southeast Asia.

He taught or conducted research at institutions including IDEAS, Tokyo, Gadjah Mada University, Jawaharlal Nehru University, the National College of Arts in Lahore, Chulalongkorn University, Shanghai University, University College Cork, and University of Manchester. He held research fellowships at the École des Hautes Études en Sciences Sociales (EHESS) in Paris, at Stockholm University, and Indiana University.

== Research ==
When at the University of Cape Coast he cooperated with Jerry Rawlings, who later became Ghana’s head of state. He followed work in Ghana with research on military coups from the lower ranks in Liberia and Suriname. He did comparative research on mosques in Tunisia, Amsterdam (comparing Moroccan, Turkish and Surinamese mosques), Freiburg, Stockholm, London, Phoenix, Arizona.

Nederveen Pieterse's scholarship combines sociology, anthropology, political economy, development studies and history. His research involves several diverse themes while maintaining a global horizon and an emphasis on globalization as a historically dynamic and multidimensional process.

=== Globalization ===
Nederveen Pieterse is widely known for challenging interpretations of globalization that portray it as either Westernization or economic homogenization. Instead, he argues that globalization consists of multiple interacting historical processes that combine shifting centers of economic and political power, connectivity, and hybridity. His later work introduced concepts such as multipolar globalization, multicentrism, and connectivity, emphasizing multiple centers emerging along with economic innovation and political influence beyond the dominance of Western Europe and North America. These themes are developed in Multipolar Globalization (2018) and Connectivity and Global Studies (2021).

=== Cultural hybridity ===
One of Nederveen Pieterse's most influential theoretical contributions concerns cultural hybridization. In Globalization and Culture: Global Mélange, he argues that globalization is best understood through continuous cultural mixing, rather than cultural convergence or a clash of civilizations. He describes globalization as producing new hybrid cultural forms through interaction, migration, trade, media, and technology. The concept of global mélange has become widely cited in anthropology, sociology, globalization and cultural studies.

=== Development theory ===
Nederveen Pieterse has made significant contributions to development studies. His book Development Theory critically evaluates modernization theory, dependency theory, neoliberalism, post-development perspectives, and institutional economics while advocating a pluralistic understanding of development grounded in historical diversity. .

=== Political economy ===
His work in political economy examines changing varieties of capitalism, emerging economies, and global power shifts. He published books on China, East Asia, Southeast Asia, Brazil, Russia, and Gulf economies, arguing that globalization increasingly involves multiple regional centers rather than dominant economic powers. His recent research examines comparative work on varieties of market economies, inequality, and transitions toward multicentric global cooperation.

== Editorial work ==
Nederveen Pieterse has served on editorial boards of numerous academic journals, including Development and Change, Canadian Journal of Development Studies, Third World Quarterly, European Journal of Social Theory, Ethnicities, and Third Text. He also edits scholarly book series including Frontiers of Globalization for Palgrave Macmillan and Emerging Societies for Routledge, publishing research on globalization, comparative political economy, and development.

== Professional service ==
Beyond research and teaching, Nederveen Pieterse has contributed extensively to international academic institutions. Between 2023 and 2025 he served on the selection committee for the Spinoza–Stevin Prize of the Dutch Research Council (NWO), one of the Netherlands' highest scientific honors. He has advised universities on internationalization and interdisciplinary global studies programs and has organized numerous international conferences devoted to globalization, development, and comparative social research.

== Influence ==
Nederveen Pieterse is regarded as a contributor to globalization theory and comparative development studies. His work has influenced scholarship in sociology, anthropology, political science, international relations, and development studies, particularly through his analyses of cultural hybridity, globalization, emerging economies, and multipolarity.

== Selected books ==
- 2017. Multipolar Globalization: Emerging Economies and Development. London, Routledge
- 2017. Changing Constellations of Southeast Asia: From Northeast Asia to China, co-edited with Abdul Rahman Embong, and Siew Yean Tham, eds. 2017 London, Routledge.
- 2017. China’s Contingencies and Globalization, co-edited with Changgang Guo and Liu Debin. London, Routledge
- 2015. Globalization and Culture: Global Mélange. Rowman and Littlefield, third revised edition
- 2014. Globalization and Development in East Asia, co-edited with Jongtae Kim. New York, Routledge.
- 2013. Brazil Emerging: Inequality and Emancipation, co-edited with Adalberto Cardoso. London, Routledge.
- 2011. 21st Century Globalization: Perspectives from the Gulf, co-edited with Habibul Haque Khondker. Abu Dhabi, Zayed University Press.
- 2010. Development Theory, 2nd edition. London, Sage.
- 2009. Globalization and Emerging Societies: Development and Inequality, Boike Rehbein. Basingstoke, Palgrave Macmillan.
- 2009. Is There Hope for Uncle Sam? Beyond the American Bubble. London, Zed Books.
- 2007. Ethnicities and Global Multiculture: Pants for an Octopus. Rowman & Littlefield
- 2004. Globalization or Empire? New York, Routledge.
- 2000. Global Futures: Shaping Globalization. London, Zed Books.
- 1998. World Orders in the Making: Humanitarian Intervention and Beyond. London, Palgrave.
- 1995. White on Black: Images of Africa and Blacks in Western Popular Culture. Yale UP
- 1995. The Decolonization of Imagination, co-edited with Bhikhu Parekh. London, Zed Books.
- 1992. Christianity and Hegemony. Oxford, Berg
- 1992. Emancipations, Modern and Postmodern. London, Sage
- 1989. Empire and Emancipation: Power and Liberation on a World Scale. New York, Praeger.

== Selected articles and book chapters ==
- 2016 Multipolarity means Thinking Plural: Modernities, in G. Preyer and M. Sussmann, eds. Varieties of Multiple Modernities. Leiden, Brill, 109-121.
- 2015 China’s contingencies and globalization, Third World Quarterly 36, 11: 1985-2001.
- 2015 What happened to the Miracle Eight? Looking East in the twenty-first century, Canadian Journal of Development Studies 63, 3: 263-282.
- 2014 Rethinking Modernity and Capitalism: Add Context and Stir, Sociopedia Colloquium (e-journal)
- 2013 What is global studies? Globalizations 10, 4: 499-514 (with Comments & Response)
- 2012 Leaking Superpower: WikiLeaks and the contradictions of democracy, Third World Quarterly 33, 10: 1909-1924
- 2012 Periodizing globalization: Histories of globalization, New Global Studies 6, 2: 1-25
- 2012 Twenty-first century globalization: A new development era, Forum for Development Studies 39, 1: 1-19
- 2011 Global rebalancing: Crisis and the East-South turn, Development and Change 42, 1: 22-48
- 2009 Representing the rise of the rest as threat: Media and global divides, Global Media and Communication, 5, 2: 1-17
- 2007 Global Multiculture, Flexible Acculturation, Globalizations, 4, 1: 65-79
- 1998 My Paradigm or Yours? Alternative Development, Post Development, Reflexive Development Development and Change, 29, 2: 343-73
- 1994 Globalization as Hybridization, International Sociology, 9, 2, 1994: 161-84

== Awards ==
The JC Ruigrok Award of the Netherlands Society of Sciences, 1990 (for Empire and Emancipation: Power and Liberation on a World Scale. New York, Praeger, 1989).
