= Forced Migration Review =

- Language: English, Arabic, Spanish and French

Publication details
- History: 1987 to present
- Publisher: Refugee Studies Centre (United Kingdom)
- Frequency: Triannual
- Open access: Yes

Standard abbreviations
- ISO 4: Forced Migr. Rev.

Indexing
- ISSN: 1460-9819

Links
- Journal homepage; Online archive

Forced Migration Review (FMR) is a publication on refugee, internal displacement and statelessness issues.

== History and profile ==
It was founded in 1987 as the Refugee Participation Network newsletter. The first issue was published in November 1987. In April 1998 it was re-launched as Forced Migration Review (FMR). It is published by the University of Oxford's Refugee Studies Centre in four languages, namely English, Arabic, Spanish and French. It is also distributed without charge. It appears approximately three times a year, with occasional supplements and special issues. Most issues have a main theme and also carry some 'general articles' on other aspects of forced migration.

FMR provides a practice-oriented forum for debate on issues facing refugees and internally displaced persons in order to improve policy and practice and to involve refugees and IDPs in programme design and implementation.
