= International Association for the Study of Forced Migration =

The International Association for the Study of Forced Migration (IASFM) is a professional association for academics and practitioners involved in the field of forced migration.

The IASFM was formed in 1994 to support the International Research and Advisory Panel on Refugees and Other Displaced Persons (IRAP). IRAP had been created in 1990 to provide advice and assistance to the Refugee Studies Programme at the University of Oxford and its journal the 'Journal of Refugee Studies'.

== Governance ==
The IASFM is governed by an International Secretariat. This was initially based at the Refugee Studies Centre, at the University of Oxford. The Secretariat has since moved to the Institute for the Study of International Migration, at Georgetown University and also receives support from Centre for Refugee Studies at York University.

The Secretariat is run by an executive committee headed by the president. The current president is Paula Banerjee.

List of presidents of the IASFM:

- Art Hansen (1994–1998)
- Loes van Willigen (1998–2003)
- Joanne van Selm (2003–2005)
- Susan F. Martin (2005–2008)
- Susan McGrath (2008–2011)
- Chris Dolan (2011–2013)
- Paula Banerjee (2013-present)
