= Refugee Studies Centre =

Coordinates: 51°45′21″N 1°15′05″W

The Refugee Studies Centre (RSC) was established in 1982, as part of the University of Oxford's Department of International Development (Queen Elizabeth House), in order to promote the understanding of the causes and consequences of forced migration and to improve the lives of some of the world's most marginalised people. Its philosophy is to "combine world-class academic research with a commitment to improving the lives and situations for some of the world's most disadvantaged people".

== Overview ==
The RSC is regarded as one of the world's leading centres for multidisciplinary research and teaching on the causes and consequences of forced migration. In 2002, the RSC was awarded a Queen's Anniversary Prize for Higher and Further Education in recognition of its pioneering research and innovative education, training and outreach programmes. The centre's influence relies on an extensive network of relationships with other universities, research institutions, governments, international organisations, NGOs, and businesses.

The RSC, as part of the Oxford Department of International Development, is located at 3 Mansfield Road in Oxford, England.

== Research ==
The RSC carries out independent, multidisciplinary research on the causes, consequences, and responses to forced migration, with the emphasis on understanding the experiences of forced migration from the point of view of affected peoples. Its academic staff have expertise across various different disciplines, including law, international relations, anthropology, politics, history, economics, and geography.

The programme of research is organised around three broad areas. The first focuses on the political, economic and social contexts which are significant in understanding forced migration. The second area involves primarily anthropological, psychosocial and sociological research on the lived reality and experience and management of displacement. The third research area entails legal and political research on the development and implementation of laws and policies that relate to forced migrants.

== Study and learning ==
The MSc in Refugee and Forced Migration Studies course offered by the RSC places forced migration in a historical, global and human context, encouraging informed reflection on international and national responses to both internal and international displacement. The two-week International Summer School in Forced Migration is for practitioners, policymakers and academics involved with assistance and policy making for refugees and internally displaced persons. The RSC's short courses give participants the opportunity to receive additional professional training and develop expertise in particular refugee-related areas. Visiting Fellowships are available to senior practitioners and policymakers, post-graduate students, post-doctoral scholars and professional academics who wish to undertake a specific programme of self-directed study in an academic environment.

== Outreach ==
Forced Migration Review (FMR) is regarded by the humanitarian community as the world's most widely read journal on international refugee, statelessness and displacement issues. Published in English, Arabic, Spanish and French, it is distributed without charge to a global readership of over 12,000 organisations and individuals. The majority of its readers are from the South.

Forced Migration Online (FMO) is a web-based portal providing a wide variety of resources dealing with the situation of forced migrants worldwide. FMO was set up to offer free access to comprehensive information in an impartial environment and to promote increased awareness of human displacement issues to an international community of users. Its range of resources include a digital library of over 200,000 pages, access to back issues of journals, thematic and country-specific research guides, a directory of key organisations and an expanding multimedia section.

In addition to scholarly books and articles by staff published externally, the RSC publishes a Research in Brief series, a Working Paper Series and sponsors the Journal of Refugee Studies, the Oxford Monitor of Forced Migration and the Studies in Forced Migration book series.

The library and documentation centre of the RSC holds a large number of published and unpublished materials and research archives relating to the causes, experiences, consequences and implications of forced displacement. Its current catalogued collection comprises over 39,000 bibliographic records. In August 2009 the collection was integrated into the Bodleian Social Science Library.

The RSC organises events in response to emerging research agendas as well as to the policy needs of international NGOs, intergovernmental and government agencies. The RSC's weekly seminars and annual lectures are open to the public.

The RSC has a programme of institutional links with Southern-based agencies and academic centres involved in the study of forced migration; it works in partnership with academics, policy makers and practitioners in the South and North concerned with forced migration to strengthen research and teaching capacities and to improve policy and project practice.

The RSC was the original home of the International Association for the Study of Forced Migration.

== Notable academics ==
- Dr Barbara Harrell-Bond OBE, Founder and Director from 1982 to 1996
- Emeritus Reader David Turton, Director from 1997 to 2001
- Professor Stephen Castles, Director from 2001 to 2006
- Emeritus Professor Roger Zetter, Director from 2006 to 2011
- Emerita Professor Dawn Chatty, Director from 2011 to 2014
- Professor Alexander Betts, Director from 2014 to 2017
- Professor Matthew Gibney, Director from September 2017–present
