= Amiel Vardi =

Israeli classical scholar

Amiel Vardi (Hebrew: עמיאל ורדי) is an Israeli classical scholar, an authority on Latin literature, and an activist on behalf of Palestinian rights. A native-born Jerusalemite, he teaches at the Hebrew University of Jerusalem and lives in the German Colony neighbourhood of that city.

== Scholarly career ==
Amiel obtained his Ph.D. in 1983 at the Hebrew University of Jerusalem with a doctoral dissertation on Aulus Gellius entitled Aulus Gellius as Reader of Poetry (Hebrew). He was subsequently appointed lecturer in classics in 1995, and senior lecturer in 2002. His interests range from Literary reception in Latin to Latin Literary Theory. He has a particular research focus on the Noctes Atticae of the Latin writer Aulus Gellius, and, in the estimation of Leofranc Holford-Strevens, is one of the foremost contributors to the subject in recent times.

Vardi is also interested in the history of concept formation, and contributes to summer courses on the topic at the Van Leer Jerusalem Institute. He has analysed the development of the notion of a literary canon, and the concept of "the arts" which ancient languages had no precise term for defining in the modern sense.

== Human rights ==
Vardi did regular service in the IDF but reportedly declined to answer a call-up to serve as a soldier in the West Bank during the First Intifada. At the time he was a sergeant major in the IDF military reserve and was sentenced to 29 days' imprisonment on 16 May 1991. Amnesty International protested the measure. When the Al-Aqsa Intifada broke out, Vardi became a co-founding member of, and one of the driving forces behind a grassroots human rights organization, Ta'ayush, a mixed community of civil rights activists constituted by both Israeli and Palestinian volunteers. Ta'ayush, which is opposed to the segregational policies of the Israeli occupation of the West Bank, works towards the establishment of equality between Jewish Israelis and Palestinians. He is active, as both a guide to foreign deputations trying to grasp the dynamics of the conflict and as a protector and helping hand during Palestinian harvesting and pastoral activities. He has been present in many areas where conflict is endemic, from Yanun in the north to Susya to the far south, from Jayyus in the west near the Israeli West Bank barrier and the Green Line, to areas in East Jerusalem affected by the policy of the Judaization of Jerusalem, such as the tiny hamlet of Nuaman and Sheikh Jarrah, and in particular in the South Hebron Hills. He also works on civil rights causes for Israeli Palestinians and was active in opposing the bulldozing of the Abu Eid family residences in the Abu Toq neighborhood in Lod.

Vardi conceives of his work as the pursuit, not only of justice, but of truth and working in the South Hebron Hills to defend Bedouin from settler landgrabs "exposes the lie and reveals truth in all its clarity." Vardi has been arrested, according to his colleague and fellow activist David Dean Shulman, perhaps hundreds of times. He has throughout, Shulman adds, proved selfless, persistent and cool, displaying a legal expertise that has reportedly earned him the respect of the Israeli officers who interrogate him. He has received written apologies for unlawful arrest. Part of Ta'ayush's work is to clean pastoral terrain of poisonous pellets seeded by settlers into them to damage Palestinian flocks grazing on them and in this area Vardi has reportedly also acquired an extensive knowledge of toxins. He has a high regard for Ezra Nawi, who, Vardi says, unlike most Ta'ayush activists has no comfortable employment. Though they often disagree, Nawi's mastery of Arabic, and his intuitive grasp of the underlying problems, is crucial for all of the other human rights groups, such as Ta'ayush, Yesh Din, Rabbis for Human Rights and Physicians for Human Rights, who all work in the Hebron area. (Note: Vardi & Hochheimer 2009: "Einer der Hauptgründe, warum Ezra eine so wichtige Person ist, ist seine Persönlichkeit. Ich meine, er ist eine leichte Beute für seine Kritiker, da er irakischen Ursprungs ist und von Beruf (nur) ein Installateur. Die meisten von uns Aktivisten kommen aus gut situierten Jobs... Oft streiten wir uns über Dinge, wie sie getan werden sollten. Manchmal haben wir recht und er unrecht, aber sehr oft ist seine Intuition viel besser als unsere, weil er einfach die Palästinenser viel besser versteht. Ich kann mir keine Aktion in der ganzen Region südlich von Jerusalem ohne Ezra denken. Das trifft nicht nur für Taayush zu, sondern für alle Organisationen, die Ärzte für Menschenrechte, die Rabbiner für Menschenrechte, Yesh Din … alle hängen von Ezra ab. Deshalb ist für uns Ezra im Moment – wo er verhaftet wurde -- so wichtig.")

In the South Hebron hills, Vardi, together with other Ta'ayush volunteers, often accompanies the Palestinian shepherds as they take their flocks to slowly graze over the pastures. The presence of these Bedouin herders is strongly challenged by settlers, and a protective presence and monitoring by outside observers is deemed necessary at least once a week, usually on Friday and Saturday. Aside from dealing with the Border Police and IDF when objections are raised to the Bedouins' use of their land, the time is often passed discussing Latin, pastoral poetry and the works of Virgil with his friend David Shulman: Virgil's work proves to be, Shulman adds, "a benign and lyrical presence in this tortured Mediterranean domain."

Amiel Vardi, together with Guy Butavia and Ezra Nawi, was detained for questioning after filming illegal construction at the settlement of Avigayil on 30 March 2013, work done despite a stop-work order issued by the Israeli military administration of the West Bank. Police were apparently persuaded by Avigayil's security coordinator to treat the matter differently. They were interrogated for several hours, and a formal complaint was laid against them. Butavia and Nawi filed suit against what they saw as an abuse, and won a verdict in their favour, with damages and a formal apology in 2015. Graffiti with death threats have been sprayed on the Vardi family home. He is co-signatory of an open letter to Elie Wiesel protesting the latter's public declarations about the situation in Jerusalem.

== 2002 shooting incident ==
On 19 October 2002, Vardi was shot by settlers while helping farmers collect their olive harvest in 2002. The settler responsible got off scot-free when he was charged before a court for the incident. The incident took place outside Yanun where some weeks earlier, on 6 October, Hani Yusaf (24) of the sister village of Aqraba had been shot dead by a settler in similar circumstances. Though one settler was arrested, he was released soon after, and no indictment was laid. On the 19th. of the same month, 250 volunteers from Gush Shalom, Peace Now, Ta'ayush and the Women's Peace Coalition had come to help the locals gather in the annual harvest from their olive groves. Vardi worked with 5 villagers picking near the settlement of Yitzhar. When the settlers arrived and shouted at them only to be met with silence, they began shooting. The Palestinians ran off, but Vardi refused to budge. Unlike the times he had been shot at while serving in the IDF, he wasn't scared, he recalls, but rather furious. Identifying himself as a fellow Israeli he yelled: "I'm a Jew and I came here to help pick these olives, and I am going to pick them," only to be told he was a "dirty leftist". A shot rang out and he was wounded in the stomach, apparently by shrapnel from a cartridge that hit the ground nearby and ricocheted off.

Vardi continued his harvesting, and he consulted a doctor only after the pain persisted on his reentry to his home in Jerusalem. The doctor found it difficult to believe Vardi's account that he had been shot at by a fellow Jew. The shrapnel was removed by surgery the following day. He partially holds himself at fault for challenging the settlers with a defiant declaration. He nonetheless regards the incident as strengthening his commitment to civil rights. "After I was shot while... I knew there was no turning back."

== Safa incident ==
In June 2009, according to the account given by Vardi and hosted on Bernard Avishai's blog, when 30 Ta'ayush activists went to accompany Palestinians at Safa to their fields, on arrival they were met by 2 units of Israeli Border Police who set about systematically punching, rifle-butting and then arresting the Israeli contingent. They were handcuffed and had their heads smashed against jeeps, and the episode was caught on a Walla! video. The incident was unusual – it was in his experience the first time Israeli activists had been subjected to brutal assault- and Vardi likened the police behavior to what occurs in Iran when the authorities intervene against demonstrating groups. Simultaneously with the beatings, residents from the settlement of Bat Ayin set the villagers' olive groves alight a few hundred yards off, and were left undisturbed by the police.

== Sahar Vardi ==
His daughter, Sahar Vardi (b.1991) is also active in Human Rights causes in Israel and the Palestinian territories, having begun at the early age of 14, against her father's objections, to join protests at the weekly demonstration marches of the villagers of Bil'in. She was one of the shministim or high school refuseniks, and, on reaching her maturity, declared herself a conscientious objector to military service. She was sentenced to serve time in an Israeli military prison for several months. Her work has been recognized by the Nobel Women's Initiative. She has been struck in the face by an Israeli soldier, who hit her cheek with his rifle butt during a demonstration.

== Selected publications ==
- Why Attic Nights? Or What's in a Name? The Classical Quarterly (New Series) / Volume 43 / Issue 01 / May 1993, pp 298–301
- "Diiudicatio Locorum: Gellius and the history of a mode in ancient comparative criticism," in Classical Quarterly, Vol.46 1996, pp. 492–514
- "An anthology of early Latin epigrams? A ghost reconsidered," Classical Quarterly, Vol.50 2000, pp, 147-158
- "Brevity, conciseness, and compression in Roman poetic criticism and the text of Gellius, Noctes Atticae 19.9.10.," in Journal: American Journal of Philology Vol. 121 2000, pp. 291–298
- "Gellius against the Professors?", in Zeitschrift für Papyrologie und Epigraphik Vol.137 2001 pp41–54
- "A book of verse beneath a bough: Literature for recreation in the early principate," in Scripta Classica Israelica Vol.21 2002, pp. 83–96.
- "Genre and the book: The role of poetry collections and anthologies in the development of literary genres in the Hellenistic and Roman world," in Wool from the Loom: The Development of Literary Genres, 2002, pp. 47–60 (Hebrew)
- "Canons of Literary Texts at Rome," in M. Finkelberg, G.G. Stroumsa, Homer, the Bible, and Beyond. Literary and Religious Canons in the Ancient World, Jerusalem Studies in Religion and Culture, 2. Leiden: Brill, 2003.
- "Genre, conventions, and cultural programme in Gellius Noctes Atticae," in Leofranc Holford-Strevens and Amiel Vardi (eds.), The Worlds of Aulus Gellius, Oxford University Press 2004 pp. 159–186

== Sources ==
- Amnesty International (23 May 1991). Israel and the Occupied Territories: Selective Objectors: Lior Ovshani and Amiel Vardy (Report). Amnesty International.
- Beinart, Peter (2012). The Crisis of Zionism. Melbourne University Press. ISBN 978-1-4299-4346-8.
- Blumenthal, Max (26 January 2011). "The days of '48 have come again: 15 minutes from Tel Aviv, Israel creates a new refugee camp". Mondoweiss.
- Blumenthal, Max (2014). Goliath: Life and Loathing in Greater Israel. Nation Books. p. 240. ISBN 978-1-56858-951-0.
- Bronner, Ethan (27 June 2009). "Unlikely Ally for Residents of West Bank". The New York Times.
- Ditmars, Hadani (1 May 2009). "Peace offerings". New Internationalist. No. 422.
- Gordon, Neve (30 August 2008). "Sahar Vardi: An Israeli Refusing to Oppress". New Profile.
- Haber, Jeremiah (23 April 2010). "On Elie Wiesel on Jerusalem…". Jews for Justice for Palestinians.
- Hass, Amira (20 June 2015). "Israel Police Issues Formal Apology to West Bank Activists for Wrongful Detention, Questioning". Haaretz.
- Holford-Strevens, Leofranc (2003). Aulus Gellius: An Antonine Scholar and his Achievement: An Antonine Scholar and his Achievement. Oxford University Press. ISBN 978-0-19-151468-5.
- van der Horst, Pieter W. (23 March 2003). "Review of M. Finkelberg, G.G. Stroumsa (eds.), Homer, the Bible, and Beyond. Literary and Religious Canons in the Ancient World. Jerusalem Studies in Religion and Culture". Bryn Mawr Classical Review.
- King, Tim (26 February 2011). "Israel's Own People Increasingly Targeted by Jewish State". Salem-News.com.
- Lazaroff, Tovah (21 October 2002). "Israeli injured when settlers fire at Israeli and Palestinian olive pickers". The Jerusalem Post – via Indymedia UK.
- Livneh, Neri (16 March 2010). "So What's It Like Being Called an Israel-hater?". Haaretz. Archived from the original on 28 January 2016.
- Lynfield, Ben (20 July 2015). "Khirbet Susiya: Israeli peace activists to stage 'sleep-in' protest in Palestinian village to save it from demolition". The Independent.
- McCarthy, Rory (30 June 2009). "Israeli peace activist faces jail over homes demolition protest". The Guardian.
- "Meet Sahar Vardi, Israel". Nobel Women's Initiative. 20 September 2012.
- "Olives Harvested and Activists Detained". Ta'ayush. 30 October 2010.
- Riordon, Michael (2011). Our Way to Fight: Israeli and Palestinian Activists for Peace. Chicago Review Press. ISBN 978-1-56976-873-0.
- Rotstein, Andrea (2009). The Idea of Iambos. Oxford University Press. ISBN 978-0-19-160871-1.
- Shulman, David D. (2013). "Truth and Lies in South Hebron". Jewish Quarterly. Archived from the original on 3 November 2018.
- Shulman, David Dean (2007). Dark Hope: Working for Peace in Israel and Palestine. University of Chicago Press. ISBN 978-0-226-75580-9.
- Shulman, David Dean (27 June 2009). "Al-Safa". Bernard Avishai.
- Tamagno, Chiara (January 2010). "Ta'ayush, insieme per la difesa del diritto al pascolo". Terrasanta.net (in Italian).
- Thomas, John H. (8 December 2005). Reports from Israel-Palestine: Breaking Down Dividing Walls: Next Year in Jerusalem?. Global Ministries (Report). United Church of Christ.
- Vardi, Amiel. "Curriculum Vitae". Hebrew University of Jerusalem.
- Vardi, Amiel; Hochheimer, Jesse (2 June 2009). "Ezra Nawi: ein israelischer Menschenrechtsaktivist" [Ezra Nawi, an Israeli human rights activist] (in German). Das Palästina Portal.
- Vardi, Sahar (20 September 2012). "Meet Sahar Vardi, Israel". Nobel Women's Initiative.
- Weiss, Philip (6 July 2009). "Watching Israeli Amiel Vardi confront a stonefaced commander, I want to do klezmer all night long". Mondoweiss.
- Zidaru, Alexandru (November 2010). "Review of: Concepts of Art in History. Summer Course on the History of Concepts and Metaphors". H-Soz-u-Kult – via H-Net.
