= Ezra Nawi =

Israeli human rights activist (1951–2021)

Ezra Yitzhak Nawi
- עזרא יצחק נאווי
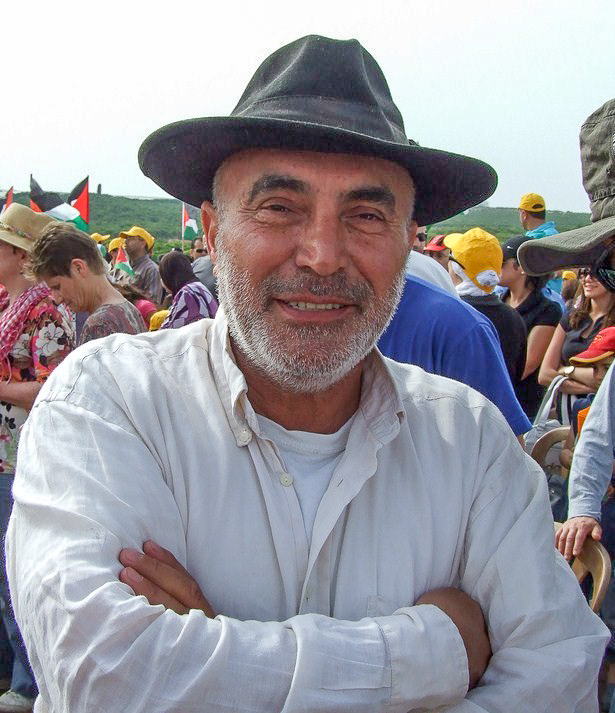
- Nawi, April 2010
- Born: 1951; Jerusalem, Israel
- Died: January 9, 2021 (aged 69–70); Jerusalem, Israel
- Occupations: Plumber, human rights activist
- Organization: Ta'ayush
- Known for: Activism in support of Palestinian rights in South Hebron Hills
- Partner: David Norris (former)

Ezra Yitzhak Nawi (Hebrew: עזרא יצחק נאווי; 1951 – 9 January 2021) was a left-wing Israeli Jew human rights activist. He was particularly active among the Bedouin herders and farmers of the South Hebron Hills and against the establishment of Israeli settlements there, in what Uri Avnery described as a protracted effort by settlers to cleanse the area of Arab villagers, in the prevention of which he played a key role. He was described as a "Ta'ayush nudnik (nuisance)", and "a working-class, liberal gay version of Joe the Plumber". (Note: Levinson 2009a: "Ezra Nawi described himself as 'a human rights activist, gay, a Mizrahi Jew who also manages to screw the state. They just don't know how to deal with me'.")

He was regarded by some as an extreme leftist activist and troublemaker. (Note: Konrad 2016a: "Nawi.. is openly despised by settlers and generally revered by Israeli activists.") (Note: Bronner 2009: "That is not the view of the settlers. 'He is a troublemaker,' asserted Yehoshua Mor-Yosef, a spokesman for Israeli settler communities in the area. 'It's true that from time to time there is a problem of some settlers coming out of their settlements to cause problems. But people like Nawi don't want a solution. Their whole aim is to cause trouble'.") He was charged with numerous infractions of the law, with convictions ranging from statutory rape, illegal use of a weapon and possession of drugs to assaulting two policemen. In addition, he also served several short stints in prison as a consequence of his activism. Defenders claimed that many of the prosecutions were politically motivated.

David Shulman regarded him as a major obstacle to the theft of Palestinian land, and considered him an Israeli exponent of Gandhian civil disobedience. (Note: Shulman 2009b: Shulman, when asked to define what he meant in calling Nawi an exponent of non-violent protest, replied: "I mean the tradition of Mahatma Gandhi and Dr. Martin Luther King Jr. and Henry David Thoreau".) Nawi once said that he would strike back when attacked. (Note: "Nawi is not afraid. Over the years, he has clashed with the settlers dozens of times and does not shy away from confrontation. Some say he is even looking for it. 'The settlers have become used to seeing Israelis caving in and crumpling when they get beaten', he says. 'I don't cave in. If anyone beats me, I strike him back. And I'm not exactly a pip-squeak'." (Hasson 2005a)) He came to international attention after being convicted in 2007 of participating in a riot and assaulting two police officers in connection with the demolition of Bedouin homes in the West Bank by Israeli border policemen. (Note: McGirk 2009: "I'm Mizrahi [a Jew whose family immigrated to Israel from the Arab world].") His trial and imprisonment spurred a worldwide protest against his treatment that elicited 20,000 signatures.

In 2008, Nissim Mossek produced a film on his life, private and public, which had mixed reviews.

In 2015, an undercover pro-settler group taped him bragging that he had identified Palestinian land brokers willing to sell land to Israeli or Jewish brokers to the PA security services. Under Palestinian law, such sales are a capital offence, and Nawi claimed they would be tortured and killed. The case triggered a political backlash in Israel and there were calls for England and France to stop foreign funding of two Israeli civil rights NGOs, Ta'ayush and B'Tselem, whose members were involved in the incident. Nawi and two others were arrested, and then released and banned from the West Bank for two weeks.

== Biography ==
Ezra Nawi was born in Jerusalem, one of five siblings, to a Mizrahi Jewish Iraqi family originally from Basra, which had made aliyah from Kurdistan shortly before his birth. (Note: Gascón 2011: "El Israelí Ezra Nawi,.. nació en Jerusalén en 1952, poco después de que sus padres emigrasen desde el Kurdistán iraquí,..") His mother gave birth to him when she was 14 years old. He was raised by a grandmother who spoke to him in Iraqi Arabic, an accent he still retained. When Nawi was a teenager, they lived next door to Reuven Kaminer, a leading figure in Israel's Communist Party, and Kaminer, he has reminisced, influenced his activism. As a conscript in the IDF, he served in a combat engineering unit. After the 1973 Yom Kippur War, where his duties included laying mines along the Suez Canal, he went abroad, travelling widely in the US and Europe, spending some time in both the UK and Ireland.

Nawi worked as a plumber. He was openly gay. He developed an interest in human rights, which he said comes from his experience of "belonging to a despised minority", after meeting Irish University lecturer David Norris and forming a relationship with him in Dublin when they met at Christmas in 1975. Nawi insisted on going home with Norris after meeting him at a party – it was mutual love at first sight – and Norris found his sterile home, replete with every modern commodity but where only eggs and tea were the staple, suddenly transformed as Nawi's spicy Middle Eastern cooking suffused his Edwardian home. Nawi mulled the idea of emigrating to Ireland; Norris helped him buy a home in Ramot. Their partnership, predominantly a mariage blanc since the physical side ended after three years, lasted 10 years, and ultimately broke up after Nawi refused to commit, having in the meantime fallen in love with an Israeli athlete, with whom he lived for a decade. The three remained on the best of terms.

Nawi suffered his first stroke shortly after the release of an Uvda broadcast. Close friends attributed it to the severe harassment he had experienced. He suffered another stroke in the summer of 2020, and during his hospitalization doctors discovered he had a brain tumour. He had recurrent minor strokes later that year, in autumn. He died on 9 January 2021 in Jerusalem, at the age of 69. Shortly before his death, he remarked to his friend David Shulman, "I did something good with my life," and to Amira Hass that, "I could have done much more."

== Political activism ==
His interest in human rights developed over several years while he shared his home in Jerusalem with a West Bank Palestinian, Fuad Mussa, who feared an honour killing because of his homosexuality. Nawi was convicted on charges of allowing his partner to live illegally with him in Israel. The difficulties they encountered acquainted him with the hardships of Arab life, and, he said, this was a turning point that led him to embrace an activist role in the West Bank in the 1980s. Friends and clients of Nawi's raised £30,000 to bail out his companion when Fuad was arrested after restrictions tightened during the Second Intifada. An appeal was made to the President of Israel, Moshe Katsav, for his release, and an ex-gratia permit was eventually given to them to allow the couple to reside together in Jerusalem. By then, however, the relationship had broken up. Nawi had in the meantime joined the Jewish-Arab human rights organization Ta'ayush, where his fluency in both Hebrew and Arabic allowed him to serve as a liaison between local Palestinians in the Hebron area and Israeli activists. According to Amiel Vardi, a classics scholar of Hebrew University and co-founder of Ta'ayush, he had an instinctive sense of relations with Palestinians which other activists, many of them Jewish intellectuals, lack. (Note: Steckner 2010 writes that his peculiar combination of qualities – gay, tradesman, Jewish yet of Arabic background, dark-skinned rather than bearing a white complexion – marks him out from the middle-class, intellectual Ashkenazis who make up much of the Israeli activist movement, and confounds all of the usual attributes on all sides. (cf. "Doch anders als viele seiner israelischen Mitstreiterinnen ist der offen homosexuelle Aktivist kein weißer Aschkenazi aus bildungsbürgerlichem Hause, sondern Mizrahi, Jude arabischen Ursprungs und Klempner von Beruf. Mit dieser Mischung aus Eigenschaften durchkreuzt er die gängigen Zuschreibungen auf allen Seiten.")) He used surplus earnings from his plumbing trade to subsidize his activities, and was reputed to charge exorbitantly for his services in order to earn enough money to donate to the fallāḥīn. (Note: Kressel 2003, p. 30 The book provides several historical, ecological and economic analyses of these Bedouin of the South Hebron Hills.)

According to Ian Buruma, his activism is more practical than political. Nawi himself said of his work, "(T)his is not about ideology. It is about decency". According to Max Blumenthal, he is widely revered by young activists as a guide and mentor in the West Bank.

Nawi, one of several Israeli activists in the South Hebron hills (Note: Shulman 2013, in addition to Nawi, cites Dolev Rahat, Dr. Amiel Vardi and Zviya Thier.) but according to David Shulman, the "real hero" of the area, is said to have adopted the distinctive cave-dwelling Bedouin resident in this zone, Eighty to a hundred members of these families, of the Bedouin al-Hathalin clan, refugees from Tel Arad in the aftermath of the 1948 Arab–Israeli War, dwell at Umm al-Khair, a village south of Hebron, 30 metres from the Israeli settlement of Carmel, Har Hebron. This is one of the many khirbehs of that area. They eke out a rough livelihood pasturing their goats and sheep on rocky land purchased from its Palestinian owners in the early 1950s. They are hardscrabble farmers of desolate hills where, according to Nawi, "nobody else would even try to grow anything," but where these Bedouin are often prevented from working the land. (Note: Gavron 2008, p. 38: "Nobody else would even try to grow anything in this place. There is absolutely no reason to prevent these people from living here. The Jewish settlers are relentless in their battle against the Palestinian residents of the territories. Apart from harassing their children, they steal their goats, plough up their crops, and cut down their olive trees. The assault on the olive trees is not confined to this Hebron hills location".) (Note: Shulman 2013: "Although the settlers are invariably the spearhead of such attacks, the occupation system as a whole is geared towards dispossession. Under Israeli law, ownership of a field which is not cultivated for three years reverts to the state; Palestinian farmers have, at best, intermittent access to their lands, because of the settler attacks. Our job is to help them in the never-ending micro-struggle for each olive tree, each well, each scraggly, thorny patch on the hill.") His attachment to these people and their biblical way of life flowed, he said, from his first encounter with them. He thought their distinctive lifestyle was subject to an "existential danger" in the way their fields were burned, their grazing stock poisoned, (Note: Baram 2004: "I was attached to this community from the moment I came in contact with it, living like people in biblical times, working the land with the most primitive tools. And all of a sudden, they are in existential danger, prosecuted, having their fields burned, their wells poisoned, their elderly beaten and their land taken away from them. You can't just walk away".) (Note: Shulman 2007, pp. 50–57 on the incident at Mufaqara, 2 April 2005. Nawi dumped the carcass of a samur weasel, a threatened species killed by the seeded poison, at the gates of the nearby Ma'on farm.) their wells poisoned, or demolished, their aged beaten and their land expropriated. (Note: Corech 2016: "A week before I got there, poison had been sprayed on their land in an attempt to kill their goat herds...I only saw women scared to feed their children goat milk because they were worried it had been poisoned.") He has been assaulted by settlers while helping Palestinians harvest olives from their own olive groves. Some, fearing for their lives, would not return to their fields unless Nawi accompanied them. He slept overnight in their houses to deter IDF soldiers reportedly throwing rocks at dwellings after dark. He was active in many of their encampments from Bi'r al-'Id to Susia and Umm al-Kheir. His arrival on the scene when settlers attacked a Bedouin family near Twamin and stole 450 head of their sheep livestock, was sufficient, according to Rabbis for Human Rights, to cause the settlers to desist and retreat.

Nawi and this small group of activists have been described as an "independent aid agency": "whatever cash went into their hands was immediately translated into solving the problems of the poorest of the land." For the last decade he has set up summer day camps for Bedouin children, brought in projectors to show them films, and taken them on trips to Jericho where, for the first time in their life, they can have an opportunity to swim. He has introduced computer technology in these communities, installed solar panels and electricity-generating windmills with the assistance of an Israeli engineer from COMET:ME for a Palestinian refugee camp. He helped ambulances get through roadblocks and handed out cash to poor people. He has organized Ta'ayush activities which involve escorting children to school and protecting them from settlers. After a Knesset committee grilled an IDF commander on the way children were being prevented from going to school, the IDF instituted armoured personnel carriers to accompany them. Such escorts however do not apply when summer camps are conducted, and, according to Nawi, a settler quipped that while the Geneva Convention guaranteed children the right to a schooling, it says nothing about their right to summer camp.

His role has drawn scorn from both the military authorities, who have detained him on numerous occasions, and from local settlers who have previously assaulted him, thrown rocks at his car at night, threatening to kill him when he intervened (Note: Shulman 2008, pp. 30–31: "passing Susya on his way back to Jerusalem when he saw a light in one of the Palestinian fields... they were stealing another field. They had already managed to lay down several rows of plastic irrigation pipes, a clear statement of ownership in this area; when the Palestinians awoke in the morning, they would discover that the settlers' boundary had been extended, at their expense, by another sizable chunk. Another irreparable loss. Ezra called the police in Kiryat Arba. But the settlers are tuned in to the police network—in effect, the two groups work hand in hand—so as soon as they heard the call, dozens of young settler toughs descended on Ezra, screaming curses and threatening to kill him. Then the soldiers arrived, and also a few of the Palestinians seeking to protect their field. The settlers attacked Ezra's car with rocks and other weapons, but miraculously he wasn't hurt.") and who have been suspected by the police of intending to assassinate him. (Note: Hasson 2005a: "In the last few weeks, police intelligence agents have warned him on several occasions that the settlers intend to take him out. 'Whoever brings his head will be very highly regarded in the settlements', says attorney Yael Barda, who helps the Palestinians in the region.") He has complained of multiple forms of harassment, from repeated fines for petty traffic incidents where enforcement is otherwise loose, to having his business audited and receiving a huge tax bill to, he suspected, having his phone monitored and being subject to vicious homophobic taunts. Some brand him ironically as "the saviour of the Arabs" whose concern for "unfortunate" Arabs extends to assisting them when they are "stealing" what settlers consider to be state lands in the southern Hebron hills and Gush Etzion.

Nawi said he did not yield ground when settlers attack, claiming that, rather than running away as other Israeli volunteers do, he hit back. In a 2005 interview, he went on record as saying:-

The settlers have become used to seeing Israelis caving in and crumpling when they get beaten. I don't cave in. If anyone beats me, I strike him back. And I'm not exactly a pip-squeak.

The Israeli academic David Shulman states that Nawi is non-violent and recalled in sworn testimony an incident that took place in Susya in 2005, where Nawi was subject to one such assault:-

"I have been through many difficult moments with him—attacks by settlers, in particular—and I have never seen him respond to violence with violence. On one occasion in Susia, in 2005, settlers broke a wooden pole over his head, and he stood his ground without hitting back. I was right beside him, and I saw it. I have witnessed such instances many times. He is committed to nonviolent protest in every fiber of his being". (Note: Shulman 2007, pp. 57–63 describes the incident, which occurred on 24 September 2005, in detail.) (Note: McGirk 2009 refers to the same incident. It took place a day after settlers from Susia had tried to drive out a local Palestinian family off their land by poisoning their well with a dead dog. Nawi and other Ta'ayush activists protected them as they drew water.)

In opposing such settler actions, which he said "serve the state's interests," Nawi is on record as saying that, "I'm here to change reality.. The only Israelis these people know are settlers and soldiers. Through me they know a different Israeli", and stated his conviction that their acts "are destroying Israel. We (Israelis) have to live side by side with the Palestinians as good neighbours, not as conquerors". (Note: Rößler 2011, p. 7: "Sie zerstören Israel. Wir müssen mit den Palästinensern als gute Nachbarn zusammenleben, nicht wie Eroberer".) Mere presence can be, he maintained, a deterrence.

In one particular episode in January 2003, captured by Shulman's eyewitness account in his book, Dark Hope (2007), armed settlers wearing skullcaps and tzitzit fringes, and hailing from a daughter settlement of Ma'on called Ma'on farm (Havat Ma'on), charged down on Twaneh peasants sowing their traditional fields while Nawi was present. As shots were fired their way and stones rained down on the sowers, Shulman got the impression Nawi seemed to relish the moment, as he rallied those about him with the cry, "Don't be afraid. Stand your ground". Joseph Dana expresses a similar view. In an incident at the village of Safa, in the face of tear-gas and live ammunition, Nawi's reaction to Dana's anxiety was to smile, slap him on the back and quip: "quite an adventure you are experiencing!" His approach, Dana concluded, cuts the tension in the air.

Shulman has recently argued that he was one of three exponents of Gandhi's principle of satyagraha in the West Bank, alongside Abdallah Abu Rahmah and Ali Abu Awwad, with the difference that Nawi was Jewish, and has probably, unlike the former two, never read a word of Gandhi's writings, but simply "reinvented Gandhian-style protest on his own.". Nawi's activism, according to Amira Hass, has brought him to the verge of bankruptcy.

== Controversy ==
Nawi was convicted on a number of charges, including illegal use of a weapon and possession of drugs—he freely admitted to smoking hash—for private use.

=== Statutory rape conviction ===
In 1995, Nawi was convicted of statutory rape of a 15-year-old Palestinian boy, after their relationship had been reported to Israeli police by the boy's parents in 1992. The legal age for such relationships is 16 in Israeli law. The statutory rape case was appealed twice. The prosecution's case was difficult due to the length of time between the offense and the appeal process, and since the victim, one year under the legal age of consent, was reluctant to testify against Nawi. After 5 years, the High Court upheld the conviction upon final appeal. It found the relationship had been consensual, sentencing him to six months based on a plea bargain, of which he served less than three. (Note: Weiss 2011: "The court ruled that the sexual relations were consensual and Mr Nawi served a jail term of less than three months.") In 2011 it was revealed that David Norris, a former partner of Nawi and the frontrunner for the position of President of Ireland at the time, had written a letter in support of Nawi on an official Seanad Éireann letterhead, and sent it to the Israeli High Court. In the letter, Norris claimed Nawi was tricked into a plea bargain and requested a noncustodial sentence. This revelation caused him to withdraw from the presidential race.

=== 2004 arrest and trial ===
He has been charged for infractions in the West Bank several times. In the first half of 2004, the Israeli prosecution filed three suits against him. The first concerned an incident that occurred after he accompanied a convoy to a harvest at Twaneh, where he was joined by Israeli novelists Meir Shalev and David Grossman and anchorman Haim Yavin. Nawi rushed to put himself between the settlers and the harvesting fellahin to protect the latter, and a settler filed a complaint to police accusing Nawi of attacking him. In addition he was caught entering Area A, forbidden to Israelis, while bringing a consignment of clothes to people in Yatta. He was also arrested for giving a ride back into the West Bank to a Palestinian who had been residing without a permit in Israel; and he was indicted once on suspicion he had hindered a settler from filming him as he helped the Palestinians. In the last instance, his lawyer questioned the plaintiff regarding the fact he had filmed the event on Sabbath, whereupon the settler replied that he had a rabbinical ruling on halakha or Jewish law, which determined that Sabbath may be desecrated if the aim is to stop a goy from stealing hay and straw, as were the Palestinians in the area, which belonged to the settlers. Nawi was convicted by the Magistrate's court and sentenced to probation and a fine of NIS 500. It emerged that the halakhic judgement had been written by the plaintiff's father a day before the trial. On appeal, the conviction was overturned by a District Court when his lawyer Lea Tsemel showed that the land concerned was owned by Palestinians.

=== 2007 arrest and trial ===
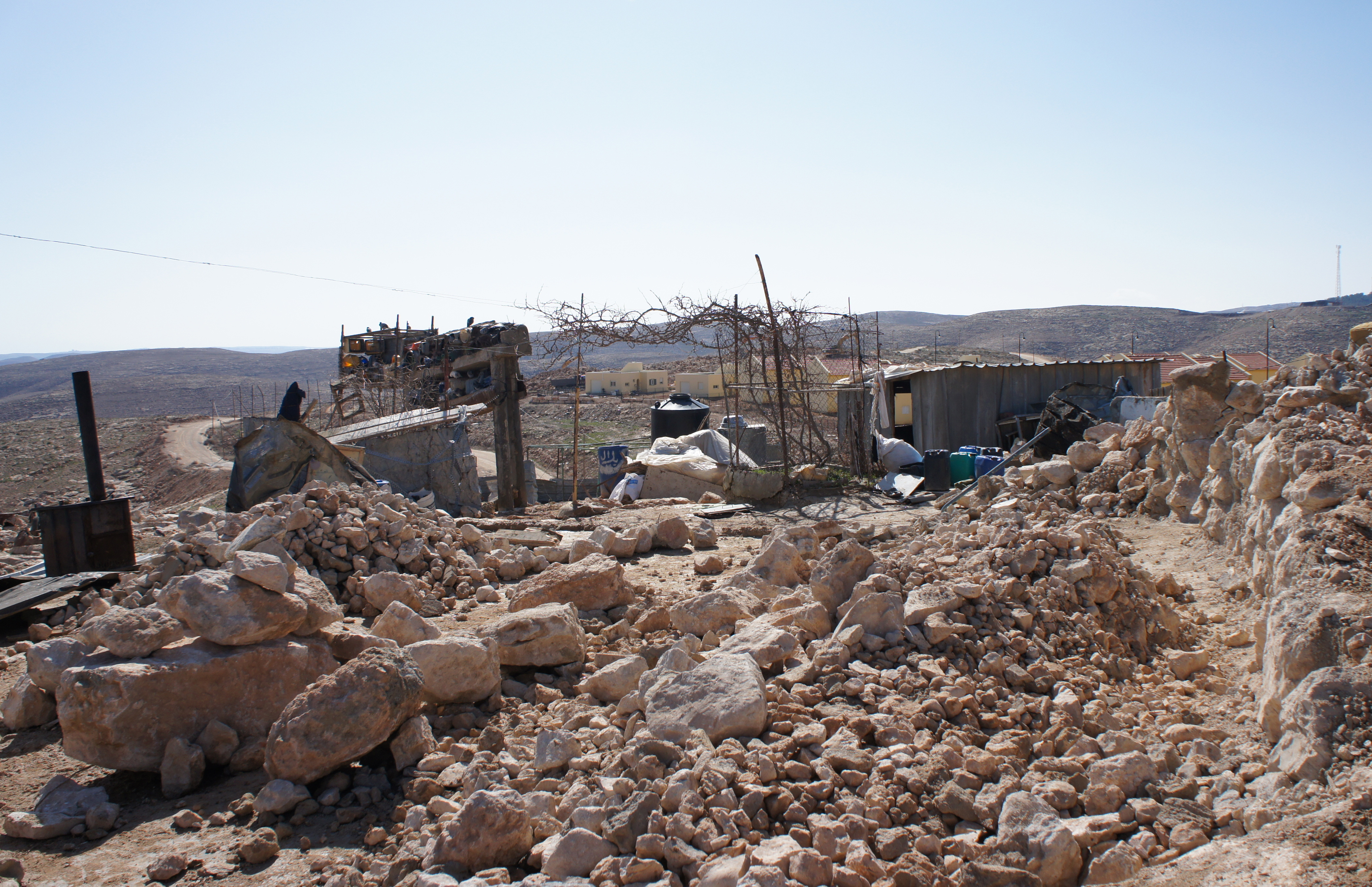
Umm al-Kheir, South Hebron Hills.

On 14 February 2007, Nawi went to assist Palestinian families whose homes, several tin and canvas shanties, were about to be razed as illegal structures. According to Shulman, these Palestinians at Um al-Kheir, which lies a few meters from rows of red-roofed settler villas at Carmel, require building permits for any house construction or extensions to their tents or shacks and such permits are almost impossible to obtain since on average, in the West Bank area administered by Israel, Area C, only one is released per month by the Israeli Civil Administration for the hundreds of thousands of Palestinian residents there. Palestinians with their large families regularly build without permits, and the occupation authorities regularly issue demolition orders, of which some 20 are carried out each month. (Note: Amnesty International 2011 reports that the Israeli NGO Bimkom calculated in 2008 that only 13 building permits were issued to Palestinians in the West Bank per year.)

Nawi considered such administrative actions "acts of war" since these Bedouin families lived in the area before the state of Israel came into existence. On that day, Nawi became involved in a clash with border police who had been sent to protect the bulldozers. Nawi threw himself before the bulldozers, and had to be dragged from their path to allow the demolition order to be executed. Though much of the incident was captured on video, the police testified later that, after they caught up with him inside a half-demolished shack, he raised his hands against them and resisted arrest in some 8 to 20 seconds not caught on video. According to Ben-Gurion university professor Neve Gordon, in the video Nawi is seen disarming a Palestinian woman of a rock she had picked up some minutes before the alleged assault. He was arrested, handcuffed and charged, although the assault later alleged was not included in the original police statements. The videotape shows that, handcuffed on a police truck, and taunted by the police for assisting Arabs, Nawi told them: "I was also a soldier, but I did not demolish houses,.. The only thing that will be left here is hatred".

At his trial, judge Eilata Ziskind determined on March 19, on the basis of testimony from the two police officers, that he was guilty as charged: that he had pushed the two policemen, incited people, behaved in an unruly manner and interrupted police in the performance of their duties.

The decision led to a public outcry, with some 140,000 letters, according to Nawi, being sent to Israeli officials. Television footage filming the clash had been broadcast on Israel's Channel 1. According to Neve Gordon, the verdict was made notwithstanding "the very clear evidence" captured on film. Arik Ascherman, Executive Director of Rabbis for Human Rights, enjoined people to rally with him before a Court of Appeal.

Sentencing, in which he was expected to serve up to two years in jail, was originally scheduled for 1 July 2009 but subsequently postponed to 21 September 2009, after the judge had been presented with a petition organized in an international campaign conducted over the internet. In August 2009, in a preliminary hearing on sentencing the court heard several witnesses, such as Shulman and Galit Hasan-Rokem, testifying on Nawi's behalf. Aside from these academics, the former Deputy Attorney General of Israel, Yehudit Karp, speaking as a character witness and as a former head of a committee that had examined law and order issues in the West Bank, wrote that the situation there was strongly distorted in favour of the settlers, and that this justified the way Nawi, whom she called a modern-day Robin Hood, behaved in conditions she considered "surreal". (Note: Bronner 2009: "the Robin Hood of the South Hebron hills".) She took the trial as the start of a dangerous process in that root problems are not addressed, and injustices wrought on Palestinians are not met by appropriate application of relevant laws.

According to Nawi, the judge instructed the court to find an interpreter to translate the sentence for Nawi's benefit, as if he, a Mizrahi Jew fluent in Hebrew, were actually a Palestinian Arab.

In his own defence, given in an article in The Nation at the time, Nawi spoke of his eight years of activism in the area, and asked rhetorically: "was I the one who poisoned and destroyed Palestinian water wells? Was I the one who beat young Palestinian children? Did I hit the elderly? Did I poison the Palestinian residents' sheep? Did I demolish homes and destroy tractors? Did I block roads and restrict movement? Was I the one who prevented people from connecting their homes to running water and electricity? Did I forbid Palestinians from building homes?" He called relations between the military, civil administration, the judicial system, the police, and the Jewish settlers, whom he regarded as the commanders, an "unholy alliance" where the end of securing full control of the Land of Israel justified any means. The Palestinians were dehumanized so that everything was permissible: land-theft, home-demolition, stealing water, arbitrary imprisonment, and on occasion murder. "In Hebrew," he added, "we say damam mutar, taking their blood is permissible". Elsewhere he is on record as arguing that the function of the violence is to "scare the Palestinians into not moving around or using their land for farming and agriculture." and that most settlers are motivated by religious ideas one cannot argue with, and that Arabs must leave. "They want Palestine."

Nawi's case elicited the attention of several prominent international figures, including Noam Chomsky, Naomi Klein, and Neve Gordon, who organized a campaign to protest against his imprisonment, calling him "one of Israel's most courageous human rights activists", and his arrest, conviction and pending imprisonment "politically motivated". Additionally, Yehudit Karp petitioned the court asking for clemency on the basis that the state had failed in its obligations to enforce the law against Israeli settlers in the Palestinian territories and that Nawi's actions against the settlers should be seen in that context. The group Jewish Voice for Peace presented the court with a petition signed by 20,000 people requesting clemency for Nawi.

On September 21, the Jerusalem Magistrates' Court sentenced him to a term of one month in prison, and fined him NIS 750 ($202), ordering him to pay an additional NIS 500 ($135) to each officer he was found guilty of assaulting.

Judge Ziskind, in her ruling, wrote that "even if there is a supreme goal, it cannot be used as an excuse to commit offenses", and that,

"Freedom of expression is not the freedom to incite and take actions that prevent or disrupt police work …Freedom of expression does not allow for riots, incitement or violence. Democracy cannot allow this, for if the law enforcement system collapses, anarchy will reign and democracy and freedom of expression will be no more...The fact that a person is acting in the name of one ideology or another, as justified as it may be, is no excuse to commit offenses in the name of that ideology, and in this matter there is no difference between left-wing activists, right-wing activists, religious, seculars, or other groups in conflict".

He was also put on three years probation, during which, if he insulted an officer, disturbed public order, or participated in an illegal protest, he would immediately suffer a further six months imprisonment. The Yesha Human Rights Organization, representing the Yesha or settlers' perspective, criticized the brevity of the one-month sentence, asserting that,

"One month in jail is like mocking the poor and emphasizes the selectivity of the law enforcement system in Judea and Samaria. (The system) allows Nawi to run wild, cooperate with Hamas members and hurt settlers, and remembers to enforce the law only when he hurts policemen".

Incarcerated on Sunday, 23 May 2010, he served out his sentence at Dekel Prison, Emek Sarah, Beer-Sheva.

Subsequent to this trial, Haaretz revealed that the prosecution had used as part of the evidence for its case Nawi's prior conviction for statutory rape. The story resurfaced once more in 2011 when the Zionist and blogger John Connolly revealed that the Irish senator and presidential candidate David Norris, a former lover of Nawi's, had written a letter to the Israeli court requesting clemency for Nawi at the time.

=== 2012 offensive language case ===
On 10 June 2012, Nawi was convicted of "offending public servants" by the Jerusalem Magistrate's Court, with Judge Cjana Lomp presiding, after it was alleged that he had called a deputy battalion commander of the IDF a "war criminal" during a clash at Susya in July 2009, when he and other activists tried to prevent Jewish settlers from establishing an outpost called Givat HaDegel (Flag Hill, alternatively Chisdi Hashem The Grace of God), and thereby depriving Palestinians of their land.

=== 2013 traffic case ===
Following an incident with a military jeep in the South Hebron hills in March 2013, Nawi was charged with crossing a solid white line while overtaking. He was acquitted of the charge by Judge Miriam Kaslassy who stated in her ruling that "It's clear as day that we're not talking about random enforcement of a traffic violation", and that the police had made Nawi commit the offence. Nawi subsequently sued the state, and was awarded 45,000 shekels compensation. The Ministry of Justice stated that the policeman and the army officer involved in the incident would be prosecuted for entrapment.

=== 2014 traffic case ===
In April 2014, Nawi, together with Guy Butavia, was stopped by police, while driving out from Jerusalem towards the South Hebron hills. The police stated that Butavia was not wearing a safety belt, that Nawi's license was not in order, and that they suspected the two of trying to hide something. A tobacco pouch was seized, on the suspicion it contained drugs. The two were detained for 8 hours at a police station, and released under house arrest for three days. The day after, the order was cancelled. Despite several allegations made by the police, the case was dropped.

Both Nawi and Butavia sued the police for harassment, claiming $28,125 in compensation. They further claimed the incident was directed at them for being human rights activists, and that video taken at the time contradicts evidence presented by the police. In June 2019, the Jerusalem Magistrates Court found in favour of Nawi and Butavia, and ordered the police to pay them 7500 shekels in damages and compensation.

=== Uvda investigation ===
In January 2016, hidden camera recordings of Nawi were broadcast by Ilana Dayan as part of the Uvda ("Fact") investigative series on Israel's Channel 2. The report revealed Nawi bragging he had passed on to the Palestinian National Security Forces the names of Palestinian land brokers willing to sell land to Jews. In the recording, Nawi relates how Palestinian property dealers mistook him for a Jew looking to purchase land, and says, "Straight away I give their pictures and phone numbers to the Preventive Security Force. The Palestinian Authority catches them and kills them. But before it kills them, they get beat up a lot." No reports have confirmed that Nawi's actions brought about the execution of any Palestinians, a practice which, according to Amira Hass, the PA has long abandoned. Mahmoud Abbas said that the PA does not execute land vendors, but sentences them to hard labour. Several unsolved murders in recent years have, however, been regarded as related to such sales.

Itzik Goldway, a reserve sergeant in the IDF and decorated veteran of Operation Protective Edge, together with his girlfriend, Julia T., are right-wing activists from the Ad Kan ("(I've had it) Up to Here") NGO, an organization whose existence was unknown until the Uvda programme was broadcast. They succeeded in befriending Nawi by infiltrating Ta'ayush. With Nawi, they observed attacks on Palestinians by Jewish settlers. They then made the tapes which Ad Kan passed on to Uvda. The quality of the video as an accurate piece of reportage has been questioned. (Note: "When I first saw it I found it hard to imagine that anyone could take it seriously; it has all the hallmarks of a hack job, a video tabloid. Clips taken on different days are bunched together randomly and accompanied by scare music and voice-over narration that romanticizes the investigators. Images of Ad Kan members setting up their cameras are interspersed with those of scary-looking Ta'ayush volunteers..But this is just a teaser toward the beginning of the program. The same conversation reappears twenty minutes later in the course of a longer discussion of the deal with the Palestinian selling land. Or rather, the same audio reappears, but the video is different. This new video, also in the car, has a different time stamp about 15 minutes later than the first one. Or perhaps it was taken on a different day altogether, since there is only a time stamp and no date stamp on the first video. The camera angle is different. A paper in the foreground on the first run-through has mysteriously vanished and there are no blinding flashes. Only in the later video does Nawi wear sunglasses. In the middle of this new video, after Nawi says that he turns people over to the Palestinian Authority, but before he is asked what happens to such people next, there is a cut, and suddenly the time stamp registers a six-minute long gap. Were there two – or three – hidden cameras? I doubt it. Did Nawi repeat the same words with exactly the same inflection after fifteen minutes, then after another six minutes, or on other occasions altogether? I doubt that as well. Only the speaker, whose mouth is invisible in both versions, connects the visuals. At the end of the new 30-second clip you can finally glimpse his mouth and it is smiling. Is Ezra's 'vicious smile' (in the words of the Jewish Press) the reason that the conversation was attached to these visuals and not to others?" (Olin 2016))

Nasser Nawaja, a Palestinian resident of Susya who has spent a lifetime defending his village from the threat of expulsion and field researcher for the Israeli human rights NGO B'Tselem, was also present in one of the putative operations, in which the land broker purportedly tried to sell Nawi, an Israeli, land which belongs to Nawaja's own family. Nawi said that he "feels like crap" for fingering these agents by deceptive means. Nawi reacted to the report's claim that he used measures of entrapment by stating that

The opposite is true. He came to me and presented himself as a land broker. Since I assumed he was sent to frame me and tarnish my name in the Palestinian community, I had no choice but to report the incident to the Palestinian Authority, lest I be deemed a land buyer. I regret that the report is part of the effort to sabotage my activities, and the activities of my friends alongside the Palestinians.

The Palestinian penal code, adopting a principle from the previous Jordanian legal system, imposes a sentence of capital punishment for anyone convicted of the sale of land to Israelis, or, according to other sources, to Jews. The law, defended by Palestinian officials as designed to prevent takeovers by settlers, has never been officially implemented.

Ad Kan, the day after the programme was telecast, filed a complaint with the Israeli police against Nawi and two other Ta'ayush activists, and against B'Tselem's Nasser Nawaja. On 11 January 2016, Nawi was arrested at Ben Gurion airport, after purchasing a flight ticket, on the suspicion of being an accessory to manslaughter, of conspiring in attempted murder, of contacting a foreign agent, of transporting an individual in Israel without a permit, and of using drugs. Subsequently, both Nasser Nawaja and a third activist Guy Butavia were arrested, denied a lawyer, with a gag order being placed on their cases as well. Butavia was released on 21 January, and Nawi remanded until 24 January. The immediate release of Nawaja was ordered by a judge, for what his lawyer called a "false arrest", since Israel had no jurisdiction in the matter. The police transferred him to Ofer prison, in what B'Tselem called a contempt of the court ruling. On 24 January a judge ordered Nawi's release to house arrest, and criticized the prosecution for failing to clarify the allegation that he was involved in the death of a Palestinian selling land. Nawi had tipped off relatives of a certain Abu Khalil that the latter was considering a land swap with an Israeli, Yonathan. His relatives would have been harmed by the sale. Some time afterwards, Abu Khalil died. The police failed to provide evidence on the cause of death. An appeal by the police against the lower court decision ordering his release was rejected on 25 January by the Jerusalem Magistrate's Court. According to his lawyer, Eitan Peleg, the police failed to determine whether the putative victim was dead or not. On 28 January, Judge David Shaul Gabai Richter nullified the cause for the arrest of both Butavia and Nawi, stating there was nothing in the evidence to substantiate the police's central allegation. He rejected a police appeal that Nawi be banned from the West Bank. He added that the case was part of a political controversy in which one side attacked the other. It was not the court's function, he concluded, to bother with politics. An appeal by police against the decision, which ruled that a ban infringed their freedom of occupation and expression, was heard on 31 January, and partially overturned Richter's ruling. The police requested that the two activists be barred from the West Bank for 2 months was partially accepted when judge Moshe Bar-Am ruled reasonable suspicions exist, and that they were to be denied entry to the West Bank for two weeks.

=== Responses ===
Both B'Tselem and Ta'ayush criticized the programme for basing their investigation almost wholly on materials passed onto them by people who infiltrated Nawi's group. Rabbis for Human Rights suspended their collaboration with Nawi until hearings could clarify the circumstances. Veterans for Breaking the Silence refused to reply to inquiries by Channel 2 stating: "We don't work for the Stasi and we don't reply to the Stasi inquiries. Whoever wants a Soviet bloc-style police state—good for them".

Israeli Prime Minister Benjamin Netanyahu commented that the documentary had "unmasked radicals among us, whose hatred for settlements has pushed them over the edge to the point of delivering innocents for torture and execution. Those who encourage murder cannot continue to hide behind the hypocritical pretense of caring for human rights." Defense Minister Moshe Ya'alon linked the incident to the BDS movement and said so-called "peace groups" would even kill Palestinians in order to trash and tarnish Israel. Naftali Bennett cited the case in an attack on the bona fides of the New Israel Fund and the European Union in funding Israeli human rights activists, and called on the British and French ambassadors to stop funding both Ta'ayush and B'Tselem.

Yuval Diskin stated Nawi should be jailed quickly but cautioned that "the data shows that there is no basis for comparison between violence coming from the right and violence coming from the left." B'Tselem commented on its Facebook page that while opposed to tortures and executions, reporting Palestinians who intend to sell Israelis Palestinian land was "the only legitimate course of action." Attorney Leah Tsemel, who defends Palestinian rights, said the complaint would not be difficult to deal with. Gideon Levy criticized Uvda's presentation, writing that it systematically ignored the crimes of Israel's occupation of the West Bank, and noted that Nawi was being likened to the perpetrators of the Duma arson attack. Both Levy and Amira Hass wrote that Uvda had failed its brief as an outlet for investigative journalism by lending its services uncritically to what Levy called a McCarthyist right-wing organization about which nothing is known (Levy) or passing on a "puff piece for a privatized, mini-Shin Bet" (Hass). They say that no background research on the sources or the contexts had been conducted. For David Shulman, Nawi's work is one of the main reasons why the civilian Palestinian population in the South Hebron hills still maintains a precarious purchase on fragments of their historic lands, and the entire episode, mounted by "moles" from a shadowy organization to discredit him has, he concludes, all the appearance of a sting operation to trap him and "legitimize the theft of Palestinian land."

== Films about Nawi ==
Nawi's story has been recounted in two documentary films. In 2005, Canadian-Jewish filmmaker Elle Flanders made a documentary entitled Zero Degree of Separation, which intertwined the story of her family in Jerusalem, for whom Ezra Nawi once worked as a gardener, with the lives of two gay couples, one of which was Nawi and his companion. In 2007, a further film about Nawi's life and work, "Citizen Nawi" (HaEzrach Nawi) directed by Nissim Mossek and produced by Sharon Schaveet, premiered at the Jerusalem Film Festival, where it won a special jury mention. The film documents the plight of the Bedouin, the difficulties of Israeli-Palestinian relations, and the hardships of being gay. Made over five years on a shoe-string budget, it was judged a somewhat messy docu by Variety film critic Leslie Felperin, who thought its director "too in love with its subject to ask tough questions". Yet, he added, it managed "to expose both Israeli and Arab bigotry and has its heart in the right liberal place". Raya Morag sees the film as basically about deep-seated Israeli homophobia and racism. Dan DiLandro, reviewing for Educational Media Reviews, wrote that the film had a number of evident problems, technical and narrative, yet judged it "an important work that shed light on many of the area's conflicts and dynamics". Michael Fox, writing for J. The Jewish News of Northern California, finds "Citizen Nawi" to be "a rough-hewn profile in courage that diligently tallies the cost of conscience", and writes of the "discomfiting power" of a "raw and occasionally wrenching film", which stirs a "certain cognitive dissonance" when one "sees Nawi threatened and insulted in the crudest terms by religious Jewish settlers and embraced as a trusted friend by a Palestinian family living in a tent". For Fox, as the film follows Nawi's travails with his lover, run-ins with the police, and battles with settlers, it suddenly jolts one out of the initial impression that Nawi's activism has liberal roots:-

"One just assumes that Nawi has always been a liberal, and that his treks to the West Bank reflect a longstanding empathy for the Palestinians. It comes as a shock when he remarks well into the film that he wasn't particularly aware of or concerned about their day-to-day hardships until he got involved with Fuad".

Nawi's instincts, Fox concludes, are those of the humanist, and the director Mossek's gutsiest move was to have made "a film that doesn't aim to inspire us with platitudes but instead tries to shock us with the hard business of building a road to peace".

Nawi's example has also influenced the Israeli film-maker Ra'anan Alexandrowicz.

== See also ==
- List of peace activists

== Sources ==
- Aderet, Ofer (9 January 2021). "Radical left-wing activist Ezra Nawi dies at 69". Haaretz.
- Avnery, Uri (16 January 2016). "The Widening Gap". Gush Shalom.
- Baram, Daphna (29 November 2004). "My plumber, my hero". The Guardian. London.
- Blumenthal, Max (2013). Goliath: Life and Loathing in Greater Israel. Nation Books. p. T199. ISBN 978-1-568-58972-5.
- Brennan, Michael (30 July 2011). "Blogger who lifted the lid on rape conviction 'deluged with hate mail'". Irish Independent.
- Bronner, Ethan (27 June 2009). "Unlikely Ally for Residents of West Bank". The New York Times.
- Bronner, Yigal (24 June 2004). "Harassment of Ezra Nawi, Ta'ayush activist and AIC associate". Alternative Information Center. Archived from the original on 29 December 2016.
- Browne, Luke (29 October 2011). "Ezra Nawi: 'I just feel sorry that my name caused David problems'". The Irish Times. Archived from the original on 25 January 2013.
- B'Tselem (21 January 2016). "Court releases B'Tselem field researcher unconditionally, but Israeli authorities still hold him in custody". B'Tselem.
- Buruma, Ian (7 April 2011). "Israel and Palestine: Robbed of Dreams". The New York Review of Books. pp. 37–39.
- Cohen, Nir (2011). Soldiers, Rebels, and Drifters: Gay Representation in Israeli Cinema. Wayne State University Press. ISBN 978-0-814-33709-7.
- Collins, Stephen (30 July 2011). "Norris presidential campaign in disarray as key staff quit". The Irish Times. Archived from the original on 24 October 2012.
- Corech, Mijal Simonet (12 January 2016). "I, too, was undercover when I met Ezra Nawi. Here's what I saw". +972 Magazine.
- Curiel, lana (27 July 2010). "1,300 policemen guard razing of Bedouin village". Ynetnews. Ynet.
- Dana, Joseph (24 May 2009). "Refusing to Conform: On Veteran Activist Ezra Nawi". Jvoices.com.
- DiLandro, Dan (20 August 2009). "Citizen Nawi". Educational Media Reviews Online (EMRO). Archived from the original on 29 December 2016.
- Ehrenreich, Ben (2016). The Way to the Spring: Life and Death in Palestine. Penguin Books. ISBN 978-0-698-14819-2.
- El Shakri, Hoda (2010). "APOCALYPTIC PASTS, ORWELLIAN FUTURES: Elle Flanders's Zero Degrees of Separation". GLQ: A Journal of Lesbian and Gay Studies. 16 (4): 612–621. doi:10.1215/10642684-2010-007.
- Felperin, Leslie (2 April 2008). "Citizen Nawi". Variety.
- Fox, Michael (6 June 2008). "Take a road trip with gay activist 'Citizen Nawi'". J. The Jewish News of Northern California.
- Gascón, E. G. (7 January 2011). "Israel destruye pozos beduinos: El ejército viola el código milenario del desierto sin una razón aparente". Público (in Spanish).
- Gavron, Daniel (2008). Holy land mosaic: stories of cooperation and coexistence between Israelis and Palestinians. Rowman & Littlefield. pp. 36–37. ISBN 978-0-7425-4013-2.
- "Gay senator David Norris quits Irish presidency bid". BBC News. 2 August 2011.
- Glickman, Aviad (3 July 2009). "Leftist gets month in jail for assault". Ynetnews. Ynet.
- Goldich, Haim (9 January 2021). פעיל השמאל הקיצוני עזרא נאווי נפטר בגיל 69 [Far-left activist Ezra Navi has died at the age of 69]. Ynet (in Hebrew).
- Gordon, Neve (6 May 2009). "Israeli activist to be jailed for caring". The Guardian. London.
- Gordon, Neve (22 May 2010). "Farewell picnic (temporary) for Ezra Nawi". Ta'ayush. Archived from the original on 10 June 2011.
- Grinberg, Mijal (25 December 2006). "Palestinians say soldiers threw rocks, destroyed property". Haaretz. Archived from the original on 5 November 2012.
- Haaretz (22 December 2005). "A humble house in the hills". Haaretz. Archived from the original on 27 June 2020.
- Haaretz (9 January 2016). "Police Complaint Filed Against Israeli Leftist Who Turned in Palestinians for Selling Land to Jews". Haaretz.
- Harman, Danna; Levinson, Chaim (31 July 2011). "Relations with Ezra Nawi threaten to derail Norris' Irish presidential hopes". Haaretz. Archived from the original on 18 July 2018.
- Hartman, Ben (25 January 2016). "Jerusalem court releases left-wing activist Ezra Nawi to house arrest". The Jerusalem Post.
- Hass, Amira (10 December 2009). "Notes from Area C / The right to return to the caves". Haaretz. Archived from the original on 5 November 2012.
- Hass, Amira (3 March 2013). "On the IDF's most wanted list: A Palestinian shepherd and two baby goats". Haaretz.
- Hass, Amira (11 January 2016). "Israeli Investigate TV Program Unsure of its Facts". Haaretz.
- Hass, Amira (11 January 2021). "Ezra Nawi, the Activist Who Upset Jewish Supremacy". Haaretz.
- Hasson, Nir (5 June 2005a). "A one-man protection force". Haaretz. Archived from the original on 9 January 2021.
- Hasson, Nir (25 September 2005b). "Settlers attack left-wing activists in the West Bank, injure two". Haaretz.
- Hasson, Nir (24 January 2016a). "Police Blasted for Holding Leftists in Jail, Despite Lack of Proof Dead Palestinian Was Murdered". Haaretz.
- Hasson, Nir (25 January 2016b). "Two Weeks Before Arrest, Left-wing Activists Filed Harassment Suit Against Police". Haaretz.
- Hasson, Nir (31 January 2016c). "Decision, Bans Left-wing Activists From West Bank". Haaretz.
- Hasson, Nir (25 January 2017). "Israel to Pay Left-wing Activist $12,000 for Road Harassment by Cops". Haaretz.
- Heffernan, Breda (1 August 2011). "Plumber Nawi became an ardent campaigner for Palestinian rights". Irish Independent.
- Herschthal, Eric (17 May 2011). "Great Souls of Israel and Palestine: Or, Today's Gandhis". The Jewish Week. Archived from the original on 27 September 2017.
- Horodnichano, Maya (12 June 2019). רדיפה פוליטית": המדינה תפצה את פעילי תעאיוש בגלל מעצר שווא" ["Political persecution": the state will compensate Taayush activists for false arrest]. Walla! News (in Hebrew).
- "In praise of.. Ezra Nawi". Editorial. The Guardian. London. 3 July 2009.
- Israel, David (8 January 2016). "Right-Wing NGO Files Complaint with Police Against Radical Activists in Land Brokers Scandal". The Jewish Press.
- "Israeli court finds Ezra Nawi guilty of calling soldiers 'war criminals'". Ta'ayush. 16 June 2012b.
- Izenberg, Dan (16 August 2009). "20,000 sign petition asking Jerusalem court not to put peace activist Ezra Nawi in jail". The Jerusalem Post.
- JTA (9 January 2016). "Left-wing Israeli says he helps kill Palestinians who sell land to Jews". The Jerusalem Post.
- Katsover, Yehudit; Matar, Nadia (5 January 2012). "Ezra Nawi in Netzer?". Magic City Morning Star. Archived from the original on 4 March 2016.
- Khoury, Jack (25 January 2016). "Court Denies Police Appeal to Keep Two Leftist Activists in Custody". Haaretz. Archived from the original on 21 July 2019.
- Klein, Naomi; Chomsky, Noam; Gordon, Neve (10 June 2009). "Ezra Nawi: An Activist in Need". Common Dreams. ISBN 978-1-74104-456-0 – via Internet Archive.
- Konrad, Edo (8 January 2016a). "Human rights groups smeared over actions of one man". +972 Magazine.
- Konrad, Edo (21 January 2016b). "These are the anti-occupation activists jailed under gag order". +972 Magazine.
- Kressel, Gideon M. (2003). Let shepherding endure: applied anthropology and the preservation of a cultural tradition in Israel and the Middle East. SUNY. ISBN 978-0-7914-5805-1.
- Kubovich, Yaniv (11 January 2016). "Police Make Airport Arrest of Left-wing Activist Who Turned Palestinians in to PA". Haaretz.
- Leibovitz, Liel (8 January 2016). "Prominent Israeli Lefties Caught Entrapping Palestinians Trying To Sell Them Land". Tablet. London.
- Levinson, Chaim (27 August 2009c). "Anti-settler lawyer urges clemency for 'Robin Hood' of the Wild West Bank". Haaretz. Archived from the original on 28 April 2020.
- Levinson, Chaim (28 August 2009a). "Campaign seeks to keep rights activist out of prison". Haaretz.
- Levinson, Chaim (21 September 2009b). "Leftist jailed for 1 month for assaulting police in West Bank". Haaretz. Archived from the original on 28 April 2020.
- Levinson, Chaim (9 August 2013). "Israel police accused of 'political' traffic law enforcement in West Bank". Haaretz.
- Levinson, Chaim (16 March 2016). "Police, Soldier to Be Charged for Entrapping Left-wing Israeli Activist". Haaretz.
- Levy, Gideon (5 September 2010). "Adding insult to injury". Haaretz. Archived from the original on 24 June 2018.
- Levy, Gideon (10 January 2016). "A Flagship of Israeli Journalism Joins the Ranks of False Propaganda". Haaretz.
- Luongo, Michael (13 January 2011). "An Unlikely Activist". The Advocate.
- Margalit, Avishai (6 December 2007). "A Moral Witness to the 'Intricate Machine': Dark Hope: Working for Peace in Israel and Palestine". The New York Review of Books. Vol. 54, no. 19. pp. 38–42.
- Massie, Alex (3 August 2011). "The Last of Mr Norris". The Spectator. Archived from the original on 3 February 2016.
- Matar, Haggai (29 January 2016). "Jerusalem court slams police over arrests of left-wing activists". +972 Magazine.
- McCarthy, Rory (30 June 2009). "Ezra Nawi expects sentence of up to 18 months for resisting 'dehumanisation' of Palestinians". The Guardian.
- McDonald, Dearbhail (4 August 2011). "I am not a paedophile, says Norris ex-partner". Irish Independent.
- McGee, Harry (6 August 2011). "Israelis leaked details of rape case, says Norris's ex-partner". The Irish Times. Archived from the original on 24 October 2012.
- McGirk, Tim (15 August 2009). "Ezra Nawi: Jewish Pacifist Facing Jail for Aiding Arabs". Time. Archived from the original on 7 November 2012.
- MEE (12 January 2016). "Prominent Israeli activist arrested after controversial TV expose". Middle East Eye.
- Melzer, Abraham (13 May 2009). "Offener Brief an den Botschafter des Staates Israel in Berlin. 'Vergleichen heißt nicht Gleichsetzen'". Neue Rheinische Zeitung (in German).
- Morag, Raya (2013). Waltzing with Bashir: Perpetrator Trauma and Cinema. I. B. Tauris. ISBN 978-0-857-72293-5.
- Nawi, Ezra (29 June 2009). "Israel's Man of Conscience". The Nation. Archived from the original on 21 September 2015.
- Norris, David (22 January 1997). "Letter of reference for Ezra Nawi" (PDF). RTÉ News. Archived from the original (PDF) on 18 January 2012.
- Norris, David (2012). A Kick Against The Pricks: The Autobiography. Random House. ISBN 978-1-448-11061-2.
- Olin, Margaret (18 January 2016). "Ezra Nawi, Ta'ayush, and 30 seconds of video". Touching Photographs.
- Olin, Margaret; Shulman, David (18 January 2021). "Ezra Nawi, 1952–2021". Mondoweiss.
- "Palestinians left homeless as Israel demolishes West Bank houses". Amnesty International. 16 September 2011. Archived from the original on 3 December 2011.
- "A report on theft and harassment". Rabbis for Human Rights. 1 November 2011.
- Rosenwaks, Anat (29 May 2010). "Ezra Nawi in gaol would appreciate letters of support". Jews for Justice for Palestinians.
- Rößler, Hans-Christian (21 July 2011). "Widerstand in den Hügeln von Hebron". Frankfurter Allgemeine. p. 7.
- Rowland, Jacky (16 August 2009). "Israeli peace activist highlights Bedouin's plight". Al Jazeera – via YouTube.
- Samaha, Nour (7 March 2012). "Revenge of the settlers". Al Jazeera.
- Sanders, Carol (4 March 2010). "A Day in the Life of an Israeli Rabbi for Human Rights". Jewish Voice for Peace.
- Schulman, Sarah (2012). Israel/Palestine and the Queer International. Duke University Press. ISBN 978-0-8223-5373-7.
- Sharon, Alina Dain (15 January 2016). "Pro-Palestinian Israeli NGOs Under Fire for Endangering Palestinians". JNS.org.
- Shemer, Yaron (2013). Identity, Place, and Subversion in Contemporary Mizrahi Cinema in Israel. University of Michigan Press. ISBN 978-0-472-11884-7.
- Shulman, David D. (2007). Dark Hope: Working for Peace in Israel and Palestine. University of Chicago Press. ISBN 978-0-226-75580-9.
- Shulman, David D. (2008). "On Being Unfree: Fences, Roadblocks, and the Iron Cage of Palestine". Manoa. 22 (2): 13–32. doi:10.1353/man.0.0042. S2CID 145654267.
- Shulman, David D. (19 June 2009a). "Where peaceful protest begets jail". Haaretz.
- Shulman, David D. (September–October 2009b). "The Trial of Ezra Nawi". Boston Review. Archived from the original on 6 November 2011.
- Shulman, David D. (3 April 2011b). "Protecting Susya II: We are all Ezra Nawi". Palestine Monitor. Archived from the original on 8 June 2011.
- Shulman, David D. (June 2011a). "Salt march to the Dead Sea: Gandhi's Palestinian reincarnation". Harper's. pp. 76–79.
- Shulman, David D. (June 2013). "Truth and Lies in South Hebron". Jewish Quarterly. Archived from the original on 3 November 2018.
- Shulman, David D. (15 January 2016). "A Sting to Legitimise the Theft of Palestinian Land". The Wire. Archived from the original on 19 January 2016.
- Soares, Andre (2007). "Jerusalem Film Festival Awards 2007". Jerusalem Film Festival.
- Steckner, Anne (19 November 2010). "Stein auf Stein: Ein Tag in der Westbank zwischen erbosten Siedlerinnen, organisierten Bauern und desorientiertem Militär". ak (in German). No. 555. Archived from the original on 4 March 2016.
- Tartakovsky, Joshua (24 January 2016). "The Limits of Israeli Liberalism: The Case of Ezra Nawi". Global Independent Analytics.
- Tatchell, Peter (11 August 2009). "Help save Ezra Nawi, for the sake of freedom in the Middle East". The Independent.
- Thomas, Amelia; Kohn, Michael; Raphael, Miriam; Raz, Dan Savery (2010). "Israel and the Palestinian Territories". Lonely Planet. ISBN 978-1-74104-456-0.
- "Umm al-Khair and Sadat al-Tha'ala". Ta'ayush. 28 January 2012a.
- Vidal, Dominique [in French]; Warschawski, Michel (2012). Un autre Israël est possible: vingt porteurs d'alternatives (in French). Editions de l'Atelier. ISBN 978-2-708-24191-6.
- Weiss, Mark (1 July 2009). "Israeli campaigner found guilty of assault". The Irish Times. Archived from the original on 6 November 2012 – via HighBeam Research.
- Weiss, Mark (3 August 2011). "Norris ex-partner's rape conviction unreported". The Irish Times.
- Wheeler, Catherine (23 August 2008). "Bedouin nomads under threat in Holy Land". The Daily Telegraph.
- Yanovsky, Roi (13 January 2016). "Left-wing activist suspected of contacting foreign agent". Ynetnews.
