= Ad Kan =

Israeli NGO

- עד כאן
- Type: Non-governmental organization
- Purpose: Israeli organization
- Location: Israel
- Director: Gilad Ach
- Website: adkan.org.il

Ad Kan [“Ad Kan” (Hebrew), or “It Stops Now”] is an Israeli activist organization which was started in 2015 by Israeli security personnel to defend Israel’s Zionist character from internal and external anti-zionist groups. The name “Ad Kan”, or “It Stops Now” is used to refer to the activities by anti-Zionist groups against the State of Israel, that they must “stop now”.

Ad Kan utilizes their espionage, research, and law divisions, as well as the media to deter these anti-Zionist and pro BDS (Boycott, Divest and Sanction of Israel) groups. The organization has executed hundreds of spy missions against these organizations and other groups in order to uncover their activities. Ad Kan’s research team investigates these and other groups to expose and map their activities and funding. The information is used to pass laws in Israel’s parliament and prosecute dozens of court cases against these organizations. They hand over this information to the Israeli security forces. On the media front, Ad Kan has aired several television documentaries on the main Israeli television channels based on their findings. They also manage social media pages in Hebrew and English on Facebook, Twitter, Instagram and TikTok.

== Background ==
Ad Kan is a right-wing, Israeli non-profit organization that investigates and protests activity, which they determine to be detrimental to the image and resilience of the State of Israel. The organization infiltrates those groups which appear to undermine Israeli law, policy or security, in order to collect first-hand information about the groups' activities and methods. Ad Kan then passes the collected information and evidence to the Israeli authorities or to the media.

== Activities ==
In 2014, Ad Kan activists, Itzik Goldway and his girlfriend infiltrated Ta'ayush, an Arab-Jewish partnership whose aims include preventing Palestinians in the South Hebron Hills from being deprived of their land and homes; they captured footage of Ezra Nawi, claiming to have lured Palestinian land sellers into deals and then turning them over to Palestinian authorities, which could potentially lead to the death penalty. The footage was aired on the Israeli investigative television program Uvda in 2016; the program was criticized by journalist Amira Hass for its failure to investigate the background, funding and sources of Ad Kan, referring to the program as "a puff piece for a privatized, mini-Shin Bet". Nawi was arrested in 2016 on suspicion of various offences, including accessory to manslaughter, conspiring in attempted murder and drug use. These charges were not pursued due to lack of evidence. He was ultimately indicted in 2018 for "cooperation with Palestinian security forces", making him the first Jew to be charged with an Oslo era law against aiding the Palestinian Authority. Nawi died in January 2021 and before the completion of the legal process.

Their investigation into the NGO Breaking the Silence claimed to show they had tried to obtain classified information about "troop deployment, operational methods and mission procedures." It led to a Channel 2 report, as well as the then defense minister Moshe Ya'alon ordering an investigation for what he termed "treason". In response, Yuli Novak, then executive director of Breaking the Silence, accused Benjamin Netanyahu of “turning Israel’s security services into a political tool" and further stated: “Netanyahu’s attempt to shut down the NGO and harm soldiers and combatants who object to the occupation should worry all those concerned for Israel’s future.” She further clarified that the information contained in the Channel 2 report had passed through the IDF censors. An inquiry by the State Attorney's Office found no evidence of wrongdoing, or criminal behaviour, on the part of Breaking the Silence; an appeal by Ad Kan against that decision also failed. At the conclusion of the appeals process executive director of Breaking the Silence, Avner Gvaryahu, stated: "It is now clear to everyone that the settlers’ organizations have lied to the press, to the prosecution, to the public and to all of us. Those trying to label soldiers who break the silence as traitors, spies and foreign agents have failed again."

In 2018, the organization put up faux demolition notices on the homes of members of the left-wing NGO HaMoked. The faux demolition notice stated "The demolition of terrorist houses prevents the next attack. Do not help terror and do not lend a hand to the next murder!" and concluded with "demolition order". In December 2018, the organization initiated a complaint against the organization Anarchists Against the Wall, the complaint led to Anarchists Against the Wall facing criminal charges for throwing stones at the security forces with the intent to harm them.

In 2020, the organization published a report about a Combatants for Peace activist, Neta Hazan, claiming she was a Palestinian Preventive Security agent. The document used to substantiate the claim was deemed forged by the courts.
