= David Norris (politician) =

Irish former politician, academic and civil rights activist (born 1944)

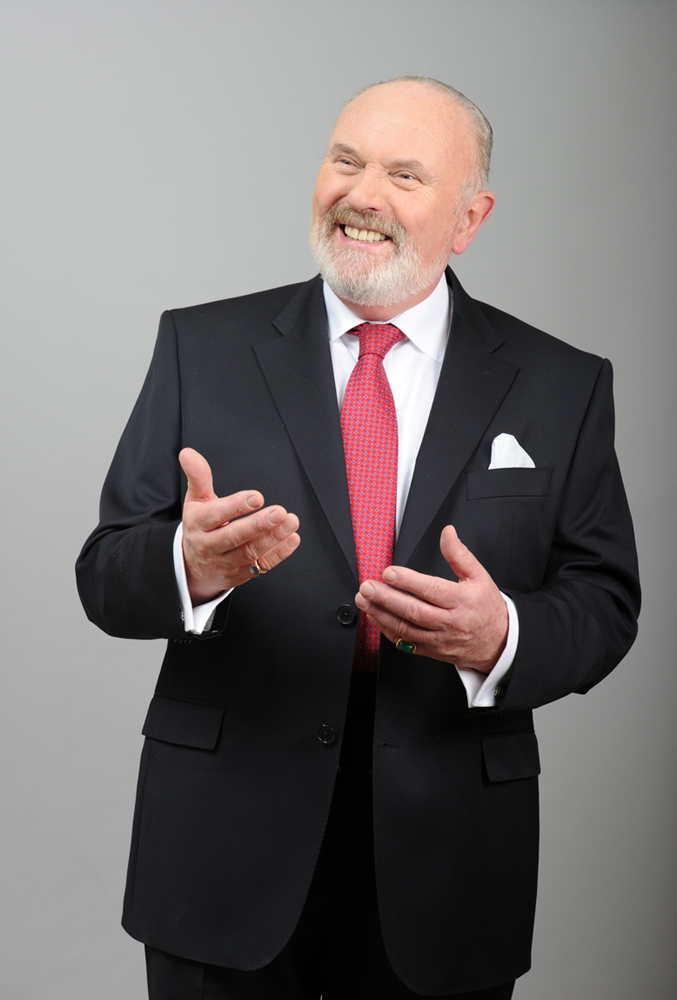
- Norris in 2011

Senator
- In office 25 April 1987 – 22 January 2024
- Constituency: Dublin University

Senior Lecturer of English Trinity College Dublin
- In office 1968–1996

Personal details
- Born: 31 July 1944 (age 82) Léopoldville, Belgian Congo (now Kinshasa, DR Congo)
- Party: Independent
- Education: Trinity College Dublin
- Profession: Scholar; Academic; Politician
- Website: Official website at the Wayback Machine (archived 9 December 2023)
- David Norris' voice (1:38) Norris recites a speech by W. B. Yeats on the topic of divorce

David Patrick Bernard Norris (born 31 July 1944) is an Irish scholar, former independent Senator, and civil rights activist. Internationally, Norris is credited with having "managed, almost single-handedly, to overthrow the anti-homosexuality law which brought about the downfall of Oscar Wilde", a feat he achieved in 1988 after a fourteen-year campaign. He has also been credited with being "almost single-handedly responsible for rehabilitating James Joyce in once disapproving Irish eyes".

Norris is a former university lecturer and was a member of the Oireachtas, serving in Seanad Éireann from 1987 to 2024. He was the first openly gay person to be elected to public office in Ireland. A founder of the Campaign for Homosexual Law Reform, he is also a prominent member of the Protestant Church of Ireland.

He was a candidate for President of Ireland in the 2011 election. He topped multiple opinion polls and was favourite among members of the Irish public for the position but withdrew from the race months before the election, before returning to the race in September 2011. In January 2024 he retired from the Seanad after 36 years service, making him the longest serving senator in Irish history.

== Early and personal life ==
David Norris was born in Léopoldville in the Belgian Congo, now known as Kinshasa, capital of the Democratic Republic of Congo, where his father (John Norris) worked as chief engineer for Lever Brothers. John Norris served in the British Armed Forces during World War I and World War II; he died while Norris was still a child. David Norris was then sent to Ireland to be cared for by his mother, Aida Fitzpatrick, and her extended family.

...while, on hearing his dad had died, he "had to squeeze out tears" because they were never that close, the death of his mother, was "totally heartbreaking".

"It destroyed my sense of reality," he adds, now. "This was somebody I loved who was there one minute, then the next minute she was gone."

After first meeting in 1975, Norris was in a long-term relationship with Israeli activist Ezra Nawi for a number of years until 1985. They continued a platonic friendship after that. In a Today FM interview with Matt Cooper in Summer 2011 Norris said (paraphrasing) "nowadays people think of a romantic relationship as a sexual one and Ezra and myself have not had that kind of relationship since the 1980s."

== Education and academic career ==
Norris attended school at St. Andrew's College and The High School. He then entered Trinity College Dublin, to read for the degree of B.A. in English Literature and Language, where he was elected a Foundation Scholar in 1965 in that subject before achieving a 1st Class Moderatorship in 1967 and editing Icarus, the university literary magazine. He remained at Trinity as a lecturer and college tutor between 1968 and 1996. His love of James Joyce is borne out in Dublin's annual Bloomsday celebrations. He defended Joyce's novel Ulysses when writer Roddy Doyle said it was "overlong, overrated and unmoving", calling Doyle a "foolish" and "moderate talent". He speaks Irish and Hebrew.

After contracting the water-borne variation of hepatitis while visiting Central Europe in 1994, Norris received disability payments from a private income continuance insurer worth thousands of euros over 16 years, from a Trinity College insurance policy. Norris left his role as a lecturer after Trinity College authorities said the situation arising from his illness was "untenable", although he remained an elected senator. Norris was hospitalised and was seriously ill for a time as a result of the condition.

== Campaigning and activism ==
Norris was initially one of a number of Irish individuals to aid in the formation of the International Gay Association in Coventry, England in 1978, and was a founding member of the Irish Gay Rights Movement and the National Gay Federation.

Norris took the Attorney General to the High Court over the criminalisation of homosexual acts. His claim was based on the fact that the law infringed on his right to privacy and that since the introduction of the Constitution of Ireland, the law passed under British rule became repugnant to the constitution. The High Court ruled against Norris. He appealed his case to the Supreme Court of Ireland. In 1983 (in Norris v. Attorney General), the Supreme Court upheld the constitutionality of the law by a three to two verdict.

Having lost the Supreme Court case, Norris took his case to the European Court of Human Rights (see Norris v. Ireland). In 1988, the European Court ruled that the law criminalising same-sex activities was contrary to the European Convention on Human Rights, in particular Article 8 which protects the right to respect for private life. The law was held to infringe on the right of adults to engage in acts of their own choice.

The first and immediate thing about the European decision is the enlargement of dignity and freedom for gay people – but I think a decision like this enhances the dignity and freedom of all the people of Ireland because it pushes us towards a more tolerant and plural society.

— Norris's reaction to the European ruling, 1988.

This law was repealed in 1993.

Norris has since then expanded his activism to a concept of "universal rights".

I did start out on that campaign [for homosexual law reform] but I found very quickly that the mechanism of discrimination was exactly the same against women, against ethnic minorities, against the handicapped, so I broadened out and this now is how I see things, very much so.

== Political career ==
=== Senator (1987 to 2024) ===
Norris represented the Dublin University constituency in the Seanad as an independent. He was first elected to the Seanad in 1987, and was re-elected at each election until his resignation in 2024. On 14 November 2023, he announced in an interview with Trinity News that he would retire in January 2024. He resigned from the Seanad in January 2024, and received tributes from president Michael D. Higgins and taoiseach Leo Varadkar delivered to the cathaoirleach. On his retirement, he was the longest-serving senator in Irish history.

=== 2011 presidential campaign ===
==== Entry ====
In March 2011, Norris announced his intention to run in the 2011 Irish presidential election. Facebook support for a presidential bid drew comparisons with Barack Obama's campaign for the American presidency. Norris topped multiple opinion polls as the person most Irish people would like to see as their next president (with the caveat that these polls were taken before all candidates have declared). Internal research by Fine Gael also placed Norris ahead of all other potential candidates.

On 14 March 2011, Norris launched his campaign to secure a nomination. On 9 May 2011, he was nominated by Fingal County Council. By the end of that month, he had secured the support of 6 TDs. Fine Gael ordered its councillors to block Norris's nomination. In late May, controversial comments Norris allegedly made in 2002 were raised on a talk radio show. Norris called this an attempt to "sabotage" his campaign. He said the quotes had been taken out of context.

Norris's candidacy was endorsed by British actor and writer Stephen Fry, who said Ireland "couldn't have a more intelligent passionate and knowledgeable witty or committed President".

In late July, it was revealed that Norris had written a letter in 1997 to an Israeli court asking clemency for his former partner Ezra Nawi, who had been convicted of the statutory rape of a 15-year-old Palestinian boy but was awaiting sentencing. Norris's letter, written on parliamentary notepaper, said that Nawi had been lured into a "carefully prepared trap" and had unwisely pleaded guilty to the charges. The story was publicised by a pro-Israel blogger John Connolly. Connolly stated that he had received a tip from "someone in the trade union movement". A number of people resigned from Norris's campaign team. While Norris himself said he remained committed to his campaign, he admitted that it was now "in serious trouble". It was claimed by some that these allegations, complete with Norris's subsequent defence of his comments on pederasty in ancient Greece would seriously damage his chances of securing a nomination. Norris refuted this, saying he still expected to receive a nomination, and the controversy did not affect his poll standings.

==== Withdrawal ====
As of 22 July, Norris had secured the support of 15 of the 20 members of the Oireachtas required for a nomination. On 1 August, the Independent TDs John Halligan, Finian McGrath and Thomas Pringle announced that they were withdrawing their support for Norris over the revelations of the Nawi plea. However, several other TDs re-iterated their support for Norris in his bid to become president. Maureen O'Sullivan, TD referred to a "nasty campaign" when expressing her continued support for Norris. Wicklow TD Stephen Donnelly said he believed it was wrong for Norris to have used Oireachtas headed notepaper, while Mick Wallace, TD said he believed Norris should not have sent the plea. Both Donnelly and Wallace also reaffirmed their support for Norris. Norris expressed his desire to continue his campaign for president. However, on 2 August, Norris announced at a press conference held at his home that he was withdrawing from the presidential race.

==== Re-entry ====
"I'm not perfect and I'm not pretending to be perfect. If you're waiting for a perfect president, you'll be waiting a long time ... I abhor abuse of children ... This would be the biggest comeback in Irish political history. I think people love a comeback."

— David Norris confirmed his re-entry into the presidential race on a late-night appearance on The Late Late Show with Ryan Tubridy on 16 September 2011.

Despite withdrawing from the presidential race in July 2011, Norris retained significant public support. A poll taken a week later showed him leading with 40% first-preference support and 50% indicating they would vote for him. In early September, over 1,000 signatures were collected in Galway in 12 hours, with similar support reported in Cork. A petition of 10,000 signatures was presented outside Leinster House shortly afterwards. Norris announced his return to the race on The Late Late Show on 16 September; a Sunday Independent/Millward Brown Lansdowne poll two days later showed him at 34% support.

Norris initially fell two Oireachtas members short of nomination but secured backing from four county councils (Fingal, Laois, Waterford and Dublin City), allowing his entry. He was helped by Labour candidate Michael D. Higgins, who encouraged party colleagues to support Norris "in the interests of democracy". Norris personally phoned Higgins to express his thanks.

By late September, Norris had four times as many Twitter followers as any other candidate.

In the first debate, on RTÉ News at One, Norris stated he would have no issue visiting Israel or meeting Pope Benedict XVI. Amid scrutiny of rivals' financial disclosures, Norris confirmed he had no stocks, shares, or directorships. He formally re-launched his campaign at the Dublin Writers Museum on 5 October 2011.

Ultimately, Norris came fifth of seven candidates in the election, receiving 109,469 (6.2%) first preference votes.

== Views ==
In 2003, Norris' website listed his concerns as "Human Rights Issues, Foreign Policy, Immigration/Asylum, European Union, Luas/Metro".

He owns a Georgian house in North Great George's Street in Dublin, he is a member of the Irish Georgian Society and is an active campaigner for the preservation of Georgian buildings in the Republic of Ireland. He has spent many of his own earnings on restoring his own home "room by room". He has campaigned for the transfer of the Abbey Theatre (National Theatre of Ireland) to the GPO in the centre of O'Connell Street. Norris is also a well-known Joycean scholar and plays a large part in Dublin's annual Bloomsday celebrations.

Norris believes himself to be an "outsider" of "accepted society" and claims this gives him a heightened awareness of other minority or "outsider" groups. He says he wishes society to become more accepting of diversity. He has campaigned on mental health and child abuse issues.

When questioned on drug legalisation he said:

The blunt instrument of criminalisation is not working because of the vast profits it generates for organised crime ... my view is that the welfare of the community, including the victims of drug abuse, may be better served by having access to quality-controlled, legally prescribed drugs.

On 31 July 2014, he delivered a speech at Seanad Éireann about the 2014 Israel–Gaza conflict to denounce the violations of human rights by the State of Israel. The video clip of the speech attracted more than 300,000 views on YouTube making Norris, at the time, the most successful Irish politician to appear on YouTube. He said:

[...] I am in favour of human rights, whether one is Israeli, gay, a woman or black. I am not changing my position. I am not anti-Israel or anti-Semitic, but I am pro-human rights for every human being.

=== Irish nationalism ===
A 2010 article in The Sunday Times claimed that Norris had, on more than one occasion, denounced the leaders of the 1916 Easter Rising as "terrorists". In May 2011, Norris denied that article's claim also, saying "That's not true, it's a slur, and it's not fair on me. Terrorists are people who use civilian casualties to advance a political end. The men of 1916 produced the proclamation, addressed equally – in an age when women didn't have the vote – to 'Irishmen and Irishwomen', that's wonderful!". The newspaper printed a retraction.

In 2014, around the centenary of the passing of the Government of Ireland Act 1914, Norris defended John Bruton's analysis of the Easter Rising. Norris concurred with Bruton in the belief that the "main" tradition of nationalism in Ireland is non-violence, citing the methods and impact of Daniel O'Connell, Charles Stewart Parnell and John Redmond. Furthermore, Norris stated that WB Yeats' impression of the leaders of the Easter Rising was correct; "if one looks at 1916, I believe Yeats was correct in his first impression of some of these people when he said that they were vainglorious. Indeed, they were. They were afraid that history would write them out. They were seen by the British as traitors to the empire but they were traitors to their own cause because Eoin MacNeill, the commander-in-chief, had cancelled the Rising and yet, they ignored that." Norris' use of "traitors to their own cause" caused significant controversy.

In 2010, Norris spoke in favour of the Republic of Ireland rejoining the Commonwealth of Nations, which it left when it became a republic in 1949. He dismissed the position of the British monarch as Head of the Commonwealth as "largely titular".

=== Religion ===
Norris is a Christian and regularly attends Church of Ireland services. He said the following of his religious beliefs:

I am the kind of Christian who believes that the most important theological principle is the principle of positive doubt. Even Christ doubted, on the cross. And I think if people say they hear the voice of God all the time and say they know what to do, then impose that on you, politically, it is theological tyranny. Whereas if you have doubt, it stops you from abusing your religious belief. Religion can be so abused in the interests of power, especially on behalf of institutions and governments.

==== Criticism of the Catholic Church ====
Norris has made statements about Catholic social teaching on homosexuality, particularly in relation to the Papacy. He criticised Pope John Paul II's statements on homosexuality because he said they led to anti-gay violence, saying that the pope was an "instrument for evil as far as I'm concerned because these constant, unremitting, ignorant, ill-informed attacks on the gay community have led to violence against the gay community". Norris also described the pope's position as "calculated and deliberate wickedness" because he "closes down scholarly enquiry" and because he "marginalised all the wonderful people like Óscar Romero, Leonardo Boff, Hans Kung, Charles Curran, all these marvellous people who are the future and the hope of the Church and, instead, put into place these mindless bureaucrats, which is intensely sad." Commenting on then Cardinal Ratzinger, he said, "Ratzinger, who is, in his mind-set, a Nazi" because he is "afraid to tell the truth," and because he and John Paul II "won't even let themselves be in the presence of the truth, because it would shatter their very stylised view of things." He later stated that he regretted using the term "Nazi" in reference to Ratzinger.

== Controversy ==
=== Fairytale of Kathmandu ===
On 11 March 2008, Norris called for the broadcast of the documentary Fairytale of Kathmandu (scheduled to be shown that evening on RTÉ) to be postponed. The film documented visits to Nepal by Irish poet Cathal Ó Searcaigh, during which he had sex with young boys. It questioned whether he was sexually exploiting the boys or engaging in child sex tourism. Norris criticised that the film had been leaked beforehand and that Ó Searcaigh had been treated harshly by the media before its broadcast. He announced to the Seanad that the film should be checked for factuality because he claimed that "public money" had been spent on it. The issue was conveyed to Deputy John Cregan, the Chairman of the Joint Committee on Communications, Energy and Natural Resources.

=== 2002 Magill magazine interview ===
In a January 2002 interview for politics/current affairs magazine Magill, Norris discussed the age of consent, incest, paedophilia and pederasty. The interviewer, restaurant critic Helen Lucy Burke, said, "I found some of his views on sexual matters deeply disturbing – notably on sex with minors". According to Burke, Norris didn't seem to support a minimum age of consent. When asked "What about paedophilia?" Norris replied, "There’s a lot of nonsense about that, and I can say this because I haven’t the slightest interest in children [...] On the other hand, they [paedophiles] do. But in terms of classic paedophilia as practised by the Greeks, where it is an older man introducing a younger man or boy to adult life, I think there can be something to be said for that. In terms of the north African experience this is endemic", and "There is a whole spectrum in my opinion. The teacher [or] the Christian Brother who puts his hand into a boy’s pocket during a history lesson, that’s at one end of the spectrum. But then there’s a person who will attack children of either sex, rape them, brutalise them and then murder them, that’s quite different”. On 30 May 2011, Burke was a guest on the talk radio show Liveline. Burke said that she had read the article to Norris before its publication and that he had wholeheartedly endorsed what was written. During the show, it was noted that the Magill article had been reported in a newspaper shortly after publication. The newspaper, Ireland on Sunday, went with the headline "Senator Backs Sex With Children". Burke claimed that, when Norris saw the reaction to the interview, he "back-tracked" and denied saying what had been quoted. She also called Norris' views "evil" and "against the law".

According to Norris, he was only read two paragraphs of the interview before publication, and he asked for corrections to be made to those paragraphs, and these corrections were not made. In a May 2011 statement on his presidential campaign website, Norris affirmed "I did not ever and would not approve of the finished article as it appeared". Norris asserts that he and Burke engaged in an "academic discussion about Classical Greece and sexual activity in a historical context; it was a hypothetical, intellectual conversation" and that the "presentation of references to sexuality in the article attributed to me were misleading in that they do not convey the context in which they were made". Norris also spoke about the Magill profile in an interview with Joe Jackson for the Sunday Independent, in which he refutes the allegations, saying he responded in "horror", and that "it so completely misrepresents everything I said. In the interview I said I cannot understand how anyone would consider it appropriate to have sex with children". During the initial interview on 30 May 2011, Burke explained on Liveline that she had "a tape somewhere around but I can't find it, it's twelve years old and I don't know whether it would be viable now". Also, when Burke was asked if she had a tape while being interviewed on RTÉ News: Six One on 31 May 2011 by Caitríona Perry, Perry asserted that "despite originally believing that she had a recording of the interview, Helen Lucy Burke is now not so sure". Burke explained, "I don't think so, I thought I had a taped cassette, but it turns out that it was in the one, I wasn't able to open it because it was a different length from the one in my existing cassette box". When Caitríona Perry asked "Do you think you have a tape anywhere else", Burke replied, "it could be under the mountains of stuff that came down when my ceiling came in". In the last days of the campaign the tape was released and according to the Irish Independent, Ms. Burke "said yesterday she found the tape recently but only released it in the last days of the campaign for "impact." She said, "it would give people something to think about when they went to the polls."

== Awards ==
- Council of Europe Travelling Scholarship
- Walter Wormser Harris Prize
- Foundation Scholarship in English Literature and Language
- European Human Rights Prize (nomination)
- In 2015, Trinity College Dublin awarded him with an honorary doctorate.
