= John Connolly (blogger) =

Irish blogger

John Connolly is a blogger who gained international attention after publicising the statutory rape conviction of Ezra Nawi, the former partner of Senator David Norris, who was at the time of Connolly's intervention the front-runner in the 2011 Irish presidential race. Connolly also highlighted the assistance Norris had provided to Ezra Nawi and his associates with their legal difficulties in Israel. Connolly's intervention drew both scorn (due to his pro-Israel political agenda) and praise (for bringing about "the first major victory of the Irish blogosphere", as described by the Irish Independent).

== Blogging activities ==
Connolly had a blog promoting conservative libertarianism and pro-Israel positions, under the title "Cranky Notions" (formerly "The System Works"). He later renounced libertarianism and became an early promoter of the US. Presidential candidate Donald Trump.

While some commentators claimed the Connolly revelations upset the "often too cosy relationship between the political and media classes in Ireland", the blogger was still the subject of much criticism after critically damaging Norris's campaign. The Guardian (a paper Connolly refers to as "Al Guardian") claimed he showed a strong "political motive to attack Norris and, by extension, Ezra Yizhak", while The Jewish Chronicle and Connolly himself wrote of anti-Semitic slurs and conspiracy theories directed at him, some claiming he was an agent of Mossad.

=== Confrontations with Christian groups ===
Connolly is an advisor to Anglican Friends of Israel. He has criticised the General Synod of the Church of England for endorsing the Ecumenical Accompaniment Programme in Palestine and Israel, a group he claims has an anti-Israel bias and a history of misleading the public about its own activities.

He has also accused the official overseas development agency of the Catholic Church in Ireland, Trócaire, of being dominated by pro-Palestinian activists and stirring up Antisemitism.

== Chris Andrews–Assad photo ==
On 6 November 2011, Connolly published a picture of the Irish politician Chris Andrews smiling and shaking hands with Bashar al-Assad of Syria. He claimed his was the first website to do so. Days later, the journalist Eoghan Harris spoke about the picture in response to criticism from Andrews on Newstalk 106, and said he wished to see it printed in his newspaper. Connolly has been very critical of Andrews and closely followed his activities on Twitter, claiming some of Andrews's tweets bordered on anti-Semitism. Andrews was eventually forced to leave his party, Fianna Fáil, after an elaborate sting operation exposed him as the man behind a fake Twitter profile attacking rival members of the party. The controversy led to renewed interest in the photo.

== See also ==
- Ian O'Doherty
