= Steven Plaut =

Israeli economist and writer (1951–2017)

- סטיבן פלאוט
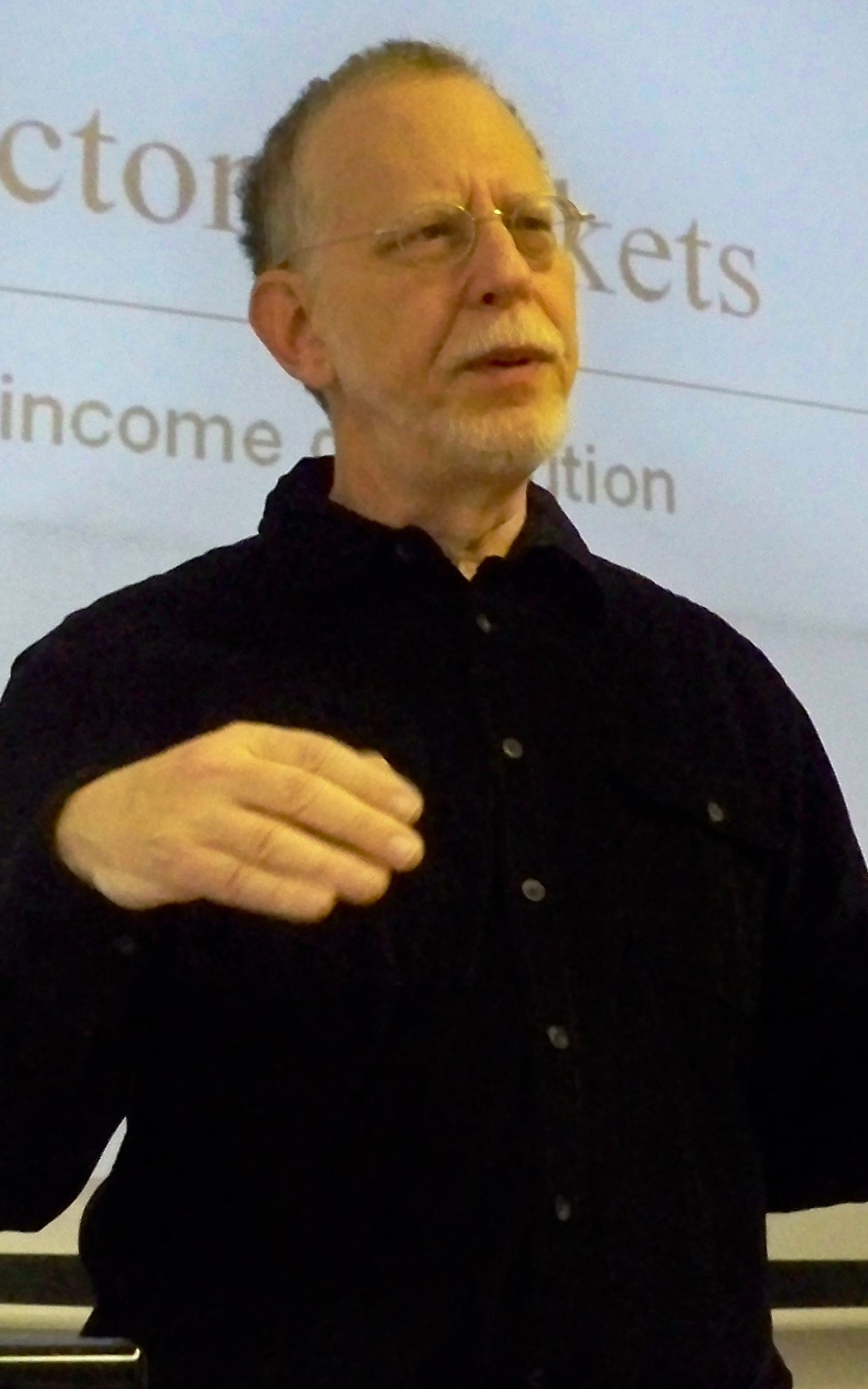
- Steven Plaut giving a lecture at Central European University in 2011
- Born: 1951; Philadelphia, Pennsylvania
- Died: January 17, 2017 (aged 65); Haifa, Israel
- Occupations: Professor, University of Haifa
- Writing career
- Subjects: Economics, business

Steven Plaut (Hebrew: סטיבן פלאוט; 1951 – January 17, 2017) was an Israeli economist, academic and writer. He was an associate professor of Business Administration at the University of Haifa as well as a member of the editorial board of the Middle East Quarterly, a publication of the Middle East Forum think tank.

== Biography ==
Steven Plaut was born in Philadelphia. In 1981, Plaut immigrated to Israel with his family. He died on January 17, 2017, in Haifa, Israel at the age of 65 after battling cancer for many years.

=== Academic career ===
Plaut received his undergraduate degree from Temple University in Philadelphia and his MA from Hebrew University of Jerusalem. He received a Ph.D. in economics from Princeton University, specializing in international and urban economics and later in finance. Plaut worked at the Federal Reserve Bank. Before his professorship at the Haifa University, he taught at Oberlin College, the Technion, UC Berkeley, UC Irvine, Central European University, Tel Aviv University, University of Nantes, and Athens Laboratory for Business Administration.

=== Literary career ===
Plaut first work was Import Dependence and Economic Vulnerability, published in 1983.

In his 1985 book titled The Joy of Capitalism, Plaut argues for free market economics and compares the profit motive to the libido. In the book he discusses energy, housing, banking and agricultural policy as well as equality and income distribution.

The Scout is a fictionalized account of Plaut's near-death experience as a kidney cancer patient in an intensive care ward. It is structured as a series of life stories exchanged between himself and another patient in the ward, an Israeli Bedouin scout. This novel was published in 2002.

=== Political views ===
Plaut was an outspoken critic of the Israeli-Arab peace process and Israel's unilateral withdrawal policy. Since the Oslo Accords, he argued that Arab leaders would continue to seek the destruction of Israel through violence and terrorism. Some of his political writings are criticisms of Nakba Day.

Plaut was critical of many Israeli left-wing figures, as well as some Americans such as Michael Lerner and Norman Finkelstein, whom he described as self-hating Jews and apologists for terrorism that are promoting the destruction of Israel. Plaut was opposed to what he saw as left-wing extremism in Israeli universities, and was actively involved in Isracampus, a self-proclaimed watchdog organization that publicizes anti-Israel people and groups. In the Canadian Jewish Tribune, he denounced Anarchists Against the Wall, a group protesting the Israeli West Bank barrier which he said was composed of "violent hooligans and anarcho-fascist thugs."

== Libel case ==
Plaut was sued for libel by Neve Gordon, a faculty member at the Ben-Gurion University of the Negev Department of Politics and Government, claiming that Plaut slandered him in certain articles and alleged e-mails. In May 2006, the Nazareth Magistrate's Court ruled in favor of Gordon, and ordered Plaut to pay Gordon 80,000 shekels in compensation plus 15,000 shekels in legal fees. Both sides appealed to the Nazareth District Court, and in February 2008, the court reversed three out of four of the libel claims but upheld a libel judgment relating to the fourth, a publication in which Plaut called Gordon a "Judenrat Wannabe". It reduced the damages to 10,000 shekels (about $2,700) on the basis that, in the court's view, Plaut was entitled to criticize Gordon.

== Letter to Turkish Prime Minister ==
In March 2013, a letter from Plaut was received by the office of Recep Tayyip Erdoğan, Prime Minister of Turkey. The letter condemned as illegal Turkey's occupation of Northern Cyprus and attacked the Turkish Prime Minister, accusing him of being behind the Gaza Flotilla "terrorist attack" on Israeli soldiers. Plaut apologized for Israel not killing a larger number of "terrorists" on the flotilla ship. He claimed it was time to give back "occupied Constantinople" to its "true owner", namely, Greece.

== See also ==
- Neo-Zionism
