= Ta'ayush =

Israeli-Palestinian activist organization

- תעאיוש (Hebrew) تعايش (Arabic)
- Formation: September 2000 (26 years ago)
- Founder: David Dean Shulman; Gadi Elgazi
- Type: Non-violent resistance; Peace movement
- Legal status: Active

Ta'ayush (Hebrew: תעאיוש, Arabic: تعايش; lit. "coexistence" or "life in common") is a grassroots volunteer movement established in the fall of 2000 by a joint network of Palestinians and Jewish-Israelis to counter the nationalist reactions aroused by the Al-Aqsa Intifada. Its members are Arabs and Jews who engage in non-violent collective action and civil disobedience to eliminate and redress segregation, dehumanization, and apartheid by constructing a true Arab-Jewish partnership. Their stated vision is a "future of equality, justice and peace" engendered by sustained non-violent actions of solidarity to "end the Israeli occupation of the Palestinian territories and to achieve full civil equality for all." Working to decelerate and ultimately halt rapidly increasing land dispossession and displacement, they engage in a set of practices termed protective presence. This is a distinctive form of resistance that involves documenting violations of international human rights and humanitarian law, as well as intervening to cease and prevent assault. Most learn or already speak enough Arabic to communicate with their Palestinian partners and residents of the South Hebron Hills.

== History ==
Ta'ayush was founded in the fall of 2000 by a joint network of Palestinians and Jewish-Israelis to counter the nationalist reactions aroused by the Al-Aqsa Intifada.

The group began performing regular weekly protective presence missions to communities in the Occupied West Bank facing state and settler violence and attempted displacement. The group attempts to leverage their Israeli citizenship of Jewish identities to cease violence against Palestinians. This unique form of resistance focuses on documenting violations of international human rights and humanitarian law while actively intervening to stop and prevent assaults, contributing to data sets on state and settler violence. Participants often sleep overnight at homes or communities facing particular threats. They often accompany shepherds on grazing shifts and assist with the yearly olive harvest.

Many participants learn or already possess sufficient Arabic language skills to effectively communicate with their Palestinian partners and residents.

=== Specific cases ===
In January 2005, Ta'ayush activists, along with Gush Shalom, the Israeli Committee Against House Demolitions, Machsom Watch, Anarchists Against the Wall and local residents of the Palestinian village Jayyous, began to plant hundred of olive saplings which they had brought with them to the plot of land where the bulldozers of the settlers had uprooted hundreds of olive trees. Advocate Wiam Shbeyta, an activist of the Ta'ayush movement said:

"In spite of the police and army assertions, we do not recognise the ownership of the settlers over this land. This land belongs to the Jayyous villagers and the company "Geulat HaKarka" which is associated with the settlers took control of it on the false assertion that it was sold to them. The matter is still awaiting legal review, and we will not allow the settlers to dictate facts on the ground, to grab Palestinian lands and to commence establishing a new settlement on it".

In 2007, after hearing that settlers had stolen a donkey from a Palestinian boy from Tuba, Ta'ayush went to the Havot Ma'on settlement to retrieve the donkey. The police and Israel Defense Forces stopped them on the way to Tuba and at the entrance of Havot Ma'on. Ta'ayush activists have also aided residents of the un-recognized village of Dar al-Hanun in Wadi Ara to repave the road to the village after it was dug up by Israeli Interior Ministry employees, the demolition had been ordered by the Haifa Magistrate's Court May 2006. The village of Dar al-Hanun was founded 80 years ago by the Abu Hilal family on a hill near the Wadi Ara route, on land owned by the family. In 1949, when the land was transferred to Israeli sovereignty, the Israeli authorities did not recognize the village, and the residents were asked to move to nearby villages.

The village of Yanun was abandoned in October 2004 when the harassment of the village by Avri Ran and his people became intolerable, leaving behind only two aged people who refused to accept the village decision to go. The village was re-occupied with the aid of peace activists from Ta'ayush and the International Solidarity Movement. David Nir of Ta'ayush was assaulted by Avri Ran in Yanun.

One member, David Dean Shulman, recalls the gratitude the cave-dwellers of the South Hebron Hills express to the Ta'ayush volunteers who struggle to ensure that they can stay on their land:

The cave-dwellers tell and retell stories of the volunteers' visits the way they tell epics; for these people, Ta'ayush matters, like oxygen to the drowning.

In 2011 Two Jewish settlers suspected of involvement in the beating of Midhat Abu Karsh, a 30-year-old Palestinian teacher and resident of as-Samu, were arrested as a result of a video recording of the incident that released by Ta'ayush which appeared on YouTube and in Israeli television.

They organized convoys of food and medical supplies to Palestinians during sieges in the Second Intifada.

== Participation ==
One-third of Ta'ayush's participants has historically comprised Palestinian citizens of Israel. A disproportionate number of participants are or were scholars and professors.

== Political positions ==
Ta'ayush has been described as belonging to the radical left. Members do not tend to identify with the Israeli left or Zionism. The organization's activities, which, like Machsom Watch, Yesh Gvul and Women in Black are focused on specific issues, rather than an inclusive approach embracing all problems, are ignored or ridiculed by the Israeli mainstream but find support among Arab Palestinian parties and the extreme left. Ta'ayush has no formal ideological criteria for involvement (attempts to form a constitution failed) and its members restrict their work to concrete activities of solidarity. As the organization evolved, the contemporary generation of activists has long tended to hold a similar socio-historical understanding of the history of the conflict. Members do not believe that the 1967 Occupied Palestinian Territories are the "original sin" in the history of Israeli violence against Palestinians. They trace the origins of the system of domination to the establishment of a colonial settler society by self-proclaimed Zionist settlers. They hold the Israeli government and its predecessor institutions as responsible for the colonization, dispossession, and ethnic cleansing of the Palestinians in 1948 and following.

Ta'ayush has a pacifist agenda and believes in the force of nonviolence, being opposed to the perpetration of war crimes by Israeli and Palestinian movements. They recognize that armed resistance is a tactic colonized peoples have historically used to liberate themselves, while believing that the most moral and durable path forward—and one that respects the unique nature of this case—is a decolonization that preserves human life above all else while working to eliminate social hierarchies and violence. While it recognizes that Israeli state practices befit the threshold for apartheid across all historic Palestine, most of its work is in the Occupied West Bank and East Jerusalem. It openly opposes the measures taken by the State of Israel in the Occupied Territories, policies that lead to 'isolation, poor medical care, house arrest, the destruction of educational institutions, and a lack of water and food for Palestinians'.

Ta'ayush activists underwrite civil disobedience and routinely break the law as they consider government's decision to be illegal according to international law and therefore illegitimate. Ta'ayush members describe operating under conditions of repression and military rule. They face frequent harassment and abuse by Israeli settlers and security forces. Many have been arrested and wrongfully detained on false or inflated charges. In April 2024, MK Itamar Ben-Gvir, the far-right Minister of Public Security formed a special police task force to explicitly target left-wing activists in the West Bank including Ta'ayush activists. Since its start, the unit's actions have resulted in the arrests of 16 foreign activists and numerous deportations of non-citizen activists.

Ta'ayush, an activist group advocating for coexistence and equality, challenges the viability of the two-state solution as a path to resolving the Israeli-Palestinian conflict. The group argues that this vision overlooks key historical and structural realities, including the establishment of a state in 1948 where Jews became the privileged ethnic group at the expense of Palestinians. This system has perpetuated inequality and forced Palestinians to live under a perpetual state of emergency. Ta'ayush members mostly contend that the two-state solution offers no resolution for millions of Palestinian refugees and necessitates further displacement.

== Controversies ==
In January 2016, Channel 2 (Israel) broadcast footage of Ta'ayush activist Ezra Nawi boasting that he poses as a prospective Jewish purchaser of land from Palestinians, then provides the Palestinian National Security Forces with the names and telephone numbers of Palestinian land brokers willing to sell land to him. Nawi is both Jewish and Israeli, and the Palestinian legal code regards sale of land to Israelis as a capital offense. Nawi said such people are beaten and executed. In the recording, Nawi says "The Authority catches them and kills them. But before they kill them they beat them up." The radical left community heavily repudiated the reporting, pointing to the political motives and set up behind the television investigation. Israel's B'Tselem commented on its Facebook page that while opposed to tortures and executions, reporting Palestinians who intend to sell Israelis Palestinian land was "the only legitimate course of action." Attorney Leah Tsemel, who defends Palestinian rights, said the complaint would not be difficult to deal with. Gideon Levy criticized Uvda's presentation, writing that it systematically ignored the crimes of Israel's occupation of the West Bank, and noted that Nawi was being likened to the perpetrators of the Duma arson attack. Both Levy and Amira Hass wrote that Uvda had failed its brief as an outlet for investigative journalism by lending its services uncritically to what Levy called a McCarthyist right-wing organization about which nothing is known (Levy) or passing on a "puff piece for a privatized, mini-Shin Bet" (Hass). They say that no background research on the sources or the contexts had been conducted. For David Shulman, Nawi's work is one of the main reasons why the civilian Palestinian population in the South Hebron hills still maintains a precarious purchase on fragments of their historic lands, and the entire episode, mounted by "moles" from a shadowy organization to discredit him has, he concludes, all the appearance of a sting operation to trap him and "legitimize the theft of Palestinian land."

== Notable members ==
Gadi Algazi; Amiel Vardi; David Dean Shulman a winner of the Israel Prize who donated the prize money to Taayush
