= Neve Gordon =

Israeli professor and academic (born 1965)

- ניב גורדון
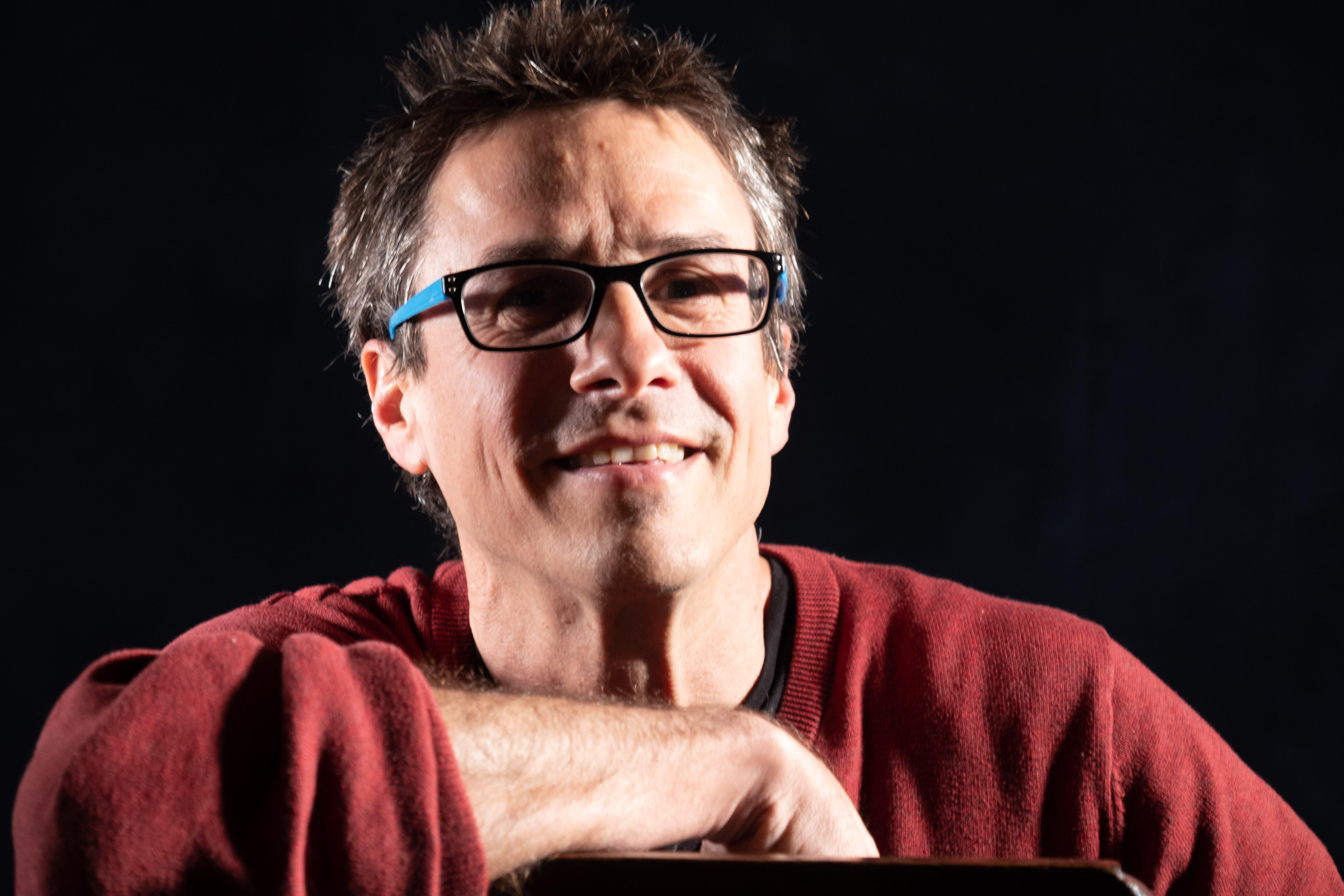
- Gordon in 2018
- Born: Israel
- Occupation: Professor

Academic background
- Education: University of Notre Dame

Academic work
- Discipline: Politics and International Law
- Institutions: Queen Mary University of London

Neve Gordon (Hebrew: ניב גורדון; born 1965) is an Israeli professor and fellow of the British Academy of Social Sciences. He is a professor of international law and human rights at Queen Mary University of London and writes on issues relating to the Israeli–Palestinian conflict and human rights. He previously taught at Ben-Gurion University of the Negev, but left after he called Israel an "apartheid state" and announcing his support for the Boycott, Divestment and Sanctions against Israel movement. He is a member of Academia for Equality, an organization working to promote democratization, equality and access to higher education for all communities living in Israel.

== Early life ==
A third-generation Israeli, Gordon completed his military service in an IDF Paratrooper unit, suffering severe injuries in action at Rosh Hanikra which left him with a disability. During the First Intifada, he served as director of Physicians for Human Rights, Israel. He is an active member in Ta'ayush, Arab-Jewish Partnership.

== Academic career ==
Gordon received his doctorate at the University of Notre Dame in 1999. In the same year, he started his academic career in the Dept. of Politics and Government at the Ben-Gurion University. He became a department chairperson in 2008-2010 and was promoted to full professor in 2015. During these years, Gordon had been a visiting scholar at University of California, Berkeley; University of Michigan; Brown University; the Institute for Advanced Study at Princeton; and at SOAS, University of London. Gordon has participated in the 'Humanitarian Action in Catastrophe' group at the Van Leer Jerusalem Institute.

In 2009, after Gordon wrote an article for the Los Angeles Times supporting a boycott of Israel and calling Israel an "apartheid state", Rivka Carmi, the president of Ben-Gurion University, declared that "academics who feel that way about their country are invited to look for different professional and personal accommodation", and right-wing organisations demanded that his department be closed. In 2012, education minister Gideon Sa'ar called for Gordon's dismissal. Around 2017, Gordon and his partner said they received threats to their lives and moved to London with their two sons, and Gordon became a professor at Queen Mary University of London.

== Publications ==
Gordon's articles have been published in LA Times, The Washington Post, The Nation, The Guardian, Ha'aretz, The Jerusalem Post, The Chicago Tribune, Boston Globe, London Review of Books, Al Jazeera, In These Times, The National Catholic Reporter, The Chronicle of Higher Education and CounterPunch.

Gordon was co-editor, together with Ruchama Marton, of Torture: Human Rights, Medical Ethics and the Case of Israel and editor of From the Margins of Globalization: Critical Perspectives on Human Rights. His book Israel's Occupation was published by the University of California Press in late 2008, and his co-authored books The Human Right to Dominate was published by Oxford University Press in 2015, and Human Shields: A History of People in the Line of Fire was also published by University of California in 2020.

== Views ==
=== Israel–Palestine conflict and Israeli politics ===
Directly after the February 2009 Israeli election, Gordon stated that it would have "devastating effects". He also stated that the new Yisrael Beiteinu party possessed "neo-fascist" tendencies. He concluded that the Obama administration should pressure the Likud-based government coalition economically and politically to adopt the two-state solution.

In 2017, Gordon described himself as a supporter of the one-state solution and as a member of the Israeli peace camp.

=== Support for economic and political boycotts of Israel ===
Gordon wrote in a Los Angeles Times editorial on August 20, 2009, that a one state solution "would amount to the demise of Israel as a Jewish state", that he supported the Boycott, Divestment and Sanctions against Israel movement, and that Israel had become right wing and "an apartheid state". This led to threats by some US donors to withhold funds from Ben-Gurion University, and to a heated debate within Israel over the rights of academics to freedom of expression.

The Ben-Gurion University management responded by denouncing Gordon's views. The president of the university, Professor Rivka Carmi, said, "We are appalled by Dr. Neve Gordon's irresponsible remarks, that morally deserve to be completely and utterly condemned. We disapprove of Gordon's disastrous views and reject his cynical exploitation of the freedom of speech in Israel and the university." Israeli Education Minister Gideon Sa'ar called Gordon's article "repugnant and deplorable. Religious Affairs Minister Ya'akov Margi called on the university to immediately suspend Gordon from his job and to publicly condemn his article.

=== Gordon – Plaut court case ===
Aside from his vocal criticism of Israeli policies, Gordon was well known in a high-profile controversy involving Steven Plaut in which Gordon sued Plaut for libel. In May 2006, the Israeli magistrate court in Nazareth ruled in favour of Gordon, and ordered Plaut to pay Gordon 80,000 shekels in compensation plus 15,000 shekels in legal fees. Both sides appealed to the District Court in Nazareth and in February 2008, the court upheld a libel judgment relating to a publication in which Plaut called Gordon a "Judenrat Wannabe" but reduced the damages to 10,000 shekels (about $2,700) because the court reversed three out of four of the libel claims. The Supreme Court of Israel rejected Plaut's request to review the case.

== Books ==
- Torture, Human Rights, Medical Ethics and the case of Israel, Zed Books, New York, ISBN 1-85649-314-8 (1995; editor, with Ruchama Marton)
- From the Margins of Globalization: Critical Perspectives on Human Rights. Lexington Books, Lanham, Maryland, ISBN 0-7391-0878-6 (2004; editor)
- Israel's Occupation. University of California Press, Berkeley California, ISBN 0-520-25531-3 (2008)
- The Human Right to Dominate with Nicola Perugini, Oxford University Press, ISBN 0199365008, ISBN 978-0199365005 (2015)
- Human Shields: A History of People in the Line of Fire with Nicola Perugini, University of California Press, ISBN 9780520301849 (2020)
- Human Shields: A History of People in the Line of Fire with a new Preface and Epilogue with Nicola Perugini, University of California Press, ISBN 9780520432567 (2026)
- The Gaza Tribunal: Britain's Complicity in Genocide with Jeremy Corbyn and Shahd Hamouri, Pluto Press, ISBN 9780745353197 (2026)
