= David Dean Shulman =

American poet

David Shulman
- דוד שולמן
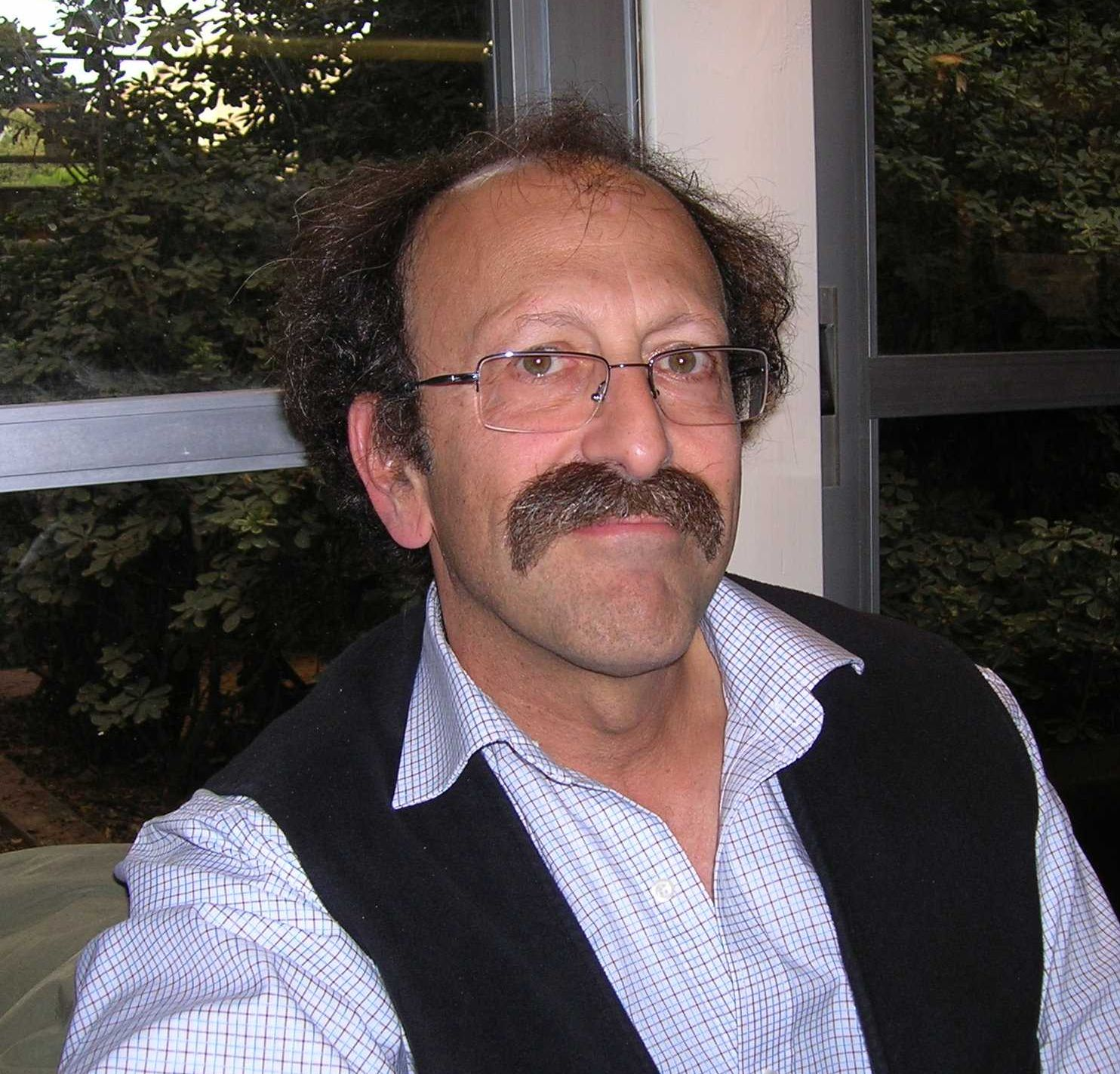
- David Shulman, 2008
- Born: 13 January 1949 (age 77); Waterloo, Iowa, United States
- Education: PhD
- Alma mater: University of London
- Occupations: Indologist poet peace activist literary critic cultural anthropologist
- Spouse: Eileen Shulman (née Lendman)
- Children: Eviatar; Mishael; Edan

David Dean Shulman (Hebrew: דוד דין שולמן; born January 13, 1949) is an Israeli Indologist, poet and peace activist, known for his work on the history of religion in South India, Indian poetics, Tamil Islam, Dravidian linguistics, and Carnatic music. Bilingual in Hebrew and English, he has mastered Sanskrit, Tamil, Hindi, and Telugu, and reads Greek, Russian, French, German, Persian, Arabic and Malayalam. He was formerly Professor of Indian Studies and Comparative Religion at the Hebrew University, Jerusalem, and professor in the now defunct Department of Indian, Iranian and Armenian Studies. Presently he holds a chair as Renee Lang Professor of Humanistic Studies at the Hebrew University in Jerusalem. He has been a member of the Israel Academy of Sciences and Humanities since 1988.

A published poet in Hebrew, Shulman is also active as a literary critic and cultural anthropologist. He has authored or co-authored more than 20 books on various subjects ranging from temple myths and temple poems to essays that cover the wide spectrum of the cultural history of South India.

Shulman is a peace activist and a member of the joint Israeli-Palestininian movement Ta'ayush. In 2007 he published the book "Dark Hope: Working for Peace in Israel and Palestine" which concludes the years of his volunteering activity in the movement. Shulman is a winner of the Israel Prize for 2016. He announced that he would donate his 75,000 shekel prize to Ta'ayush, an Israeli organization that provides support to Palestinian residents in the Hebron area.

== Life and work ==
In 1967, on graduating from Waterloo high school, he won a National Merit Scholarship, and emigrated to Israel, where he enrolled at Hebrew University of Jerusalem. He graduated in 1971 with a B.A. degree in Islamic History, specializing in Arabic. His interest in Indian studies was inspired by a friend, the English economic historian Daniel Sperber, and later by the philologist, and expert in Semitic languages, Chaim Rabin. He served in the Israel Defense Forces, and was called up to serve in the Israeli invasion of Lebanon in 1982: the medic skills he learned during his army service have proved useful in treating Palestinians injured by settler violence.

He gained his doctorate in Tamil and Sanskrit with a dissertation on 'The Mythology of the Tamil Saiva Talapuranam' (which involved field work in Tamil Nadu) at the School of Oriental and African Studies, University of London (1972–1976) under John Ralston Marr. He was appointed instructor, then lecturer in the department of Indian Studies and Comparative Religion at Hebrew University, and became a full professor in 1985. He was a MacArthur Fellow from 1987 to 1992.

In 1988, he was elected member of the Israel Academy of Sciences and Humanities. He was later elected to the American Philosophical Society in 2015. He was Director of the Jerusalem Institute of Advanced Studies for six years (1992–1998) as well as Director of The Martin Buber Society of Fellows. He actively supports the Clay Sanskrit Library, for which he is preparing, with Yigal Bronner, a forthcoming volume. He has served as a Humanities jury member for the Infosys Prize from 2019.

== Peace activism ==
Shulman is a member of the joint Israeli-Palestinian 'Life-in-Common' or Ta'ayush grass-roots movement for non-violence. He is convinced that unless 'both sides win the war, both sides will lose it.' Shulman's view on the conflict has been described as without illusions, and he expresses an awareness of the moral failings of both sides:

This conflict is not a war of the sons of light with the sons of darkness; both sides are dark, both are given to organized violence and terror, and both resort constantly to self-righteous justification and a litany of victimization, the bread-and-butter of ethnic conflict. My concern is with the darkness on my side.

Though he sees himself as a 'moral witness' to misdeeds of the 'intricate machine', Shulman shies from the limelight, admitting to an aversion to the idea of heroes, and gives interviews only reluctantly.

More recently he has been active as a leader of international campaigns to defend the Palestinians under threat of eviction from such villages as Susya in the South Hebron Hills, and especially from Silwan, where they are at risk of losing their homes as a result of the pressure on the area to have it rezoned for Israeli archaeological digs, in particular those promoted by the Elad association.

=== Dark Hope ===
In 2007, he published a book-length account, entitled Dark Hope: Working for Peace in Israel and Palestine, of his years working, and often clashing with police and settlers, to deliver food and medical supplies to Palestinian villages, while building peace in the West Bank. The distinguished Israeli novelist A. B. Yehoshua called it:

One of the most fascinating and moving accounts of Israeli-Palestinian attempts to help, indeed to save, human beings suffering under the burden of occupation and terror. Anyone who is pained and troubled by what is happening in the Holy Land should read this human document, which indeed offers a certain dark hope.

Emily Bazelon, member of the Yale Law Faculty and senior editor at Slate Magazine cited it as one of the best books of 2007. In an extensive review of the book in the New York Review of Books, Israeli philosopher Avishai Margalit cites the following passage to illustrate Shulman's position:

Israel, like any other society, has violent, sociopathic elements. What is unusual about the last four decades in Israel is that many destructive individuals have found a haven, complete with ideological legitimation, within the settlement enterprise. Here, in places like Chavat Maon, Itamar, Tapuach, and Hebron, they have, in effect, unfettered freedom to terrorize the local Palestinian population: to attack, shoot, injure, sometimes kill - all in the name of the alleged sanctity of the land and of the Jews' exclusive right to it.

Shulman's book addresses here what he calls a 'moral conundrum': how Israel, 'once a home to utopian idealists and humanists, should have engendered and given free rein to a murderous, also ultimately suicidal, messianism,' and asks if the 'humane heart of the Jewish tradition' always contains the 'seeds of self-righteous terror' he observed among settlers. He finds within himself an intersection of hope, faith and empathy, and 'the same dark forces that are active among the most predatory of the settlers', and it is this which provides him with 'a reason to act' against what he regards as 'pure, rarefied, unadulterated, unreasoning, uncontainable human evil'. He does not excuse Arabs in the book, but focuses on his own side's culpability, writing: 'I feel responsible for the atrocities committed in my name, by the Israeli half of the story. Let the Palestinians take responsibility for those committed in their name'. Writing of efforts by the IDF and members of hard-core settlements at Susya, Ma'on, Carmel and elsewhere who, having settled on Palestinian land in the hills south of Hebron, endeavour to evict the local people in the many khirbehs of a region where several thousand pacific Palestinian herders and farmers dwell in rock caves and live a 'unique life' of biblical colour, Shulman comments, according to Margalit, that:-

Nothing but malice drives this campaign to uproot the few thousand cave dwellers with their babies and lambs. They have hurt nobody. They were never a security threat. They led peaceful, if somewhat impoverished lives until the settlers came. Since then, there has been no peace. They are tormented, terrified, incredulous. As am I.

=== Bitter Landscapes of Palestine ===
The "Bitter Landscapes of Palestine" was written by David Shulman in 2024. The author narrates the lives of Palestinians living in the West Bank. He describes the confrontation between Palestinian shepherds and farmers with Jewish settlers and soldiers. He narrates daily challenges such as the destruction of houses and the expulsion of Palestinians from their land. In this book, an attempt has been made to convey to the reader the sense of the endangered Palestinian lifestyle.

== Prizes ==
- In 1987 he received a MacArthur Fellowship or "Genius Grant".
- In 2004 he received the Rothschild Prize.
- In 2010 he received The EMET Prize for Art, Science and Culture.
- In 2016 he received the Israel Prize for his research on the literature and culture of southern India. He donated the prize money ($20,000) to Ta'ayush.

== Personal life ==
Shulman is married to Eileen Shulman (née Eileen Lendman) and has three sons, Eviatar, Mishael, and Edan.

== See also ==
- List of peace activists

== Bibliography ==
Aside from numerous scholarly articles, Shulman is the author, co-author or editor of the following books.

- 1974 Hamiqdash vehamayim (poem), Neuman Press, Tel Aviv.
- 1980 (2014) Tamil Temple Myths: Sacrifice and Divine Marriage in the South Indian Saiva Tradition, Princeton University Press ISBN 978-1-400-85692-3
- 1985 (2014) The King and the Clown in South Indian Myth and Poetry, Princeton University Press ISBN 978-1-400-85775-3.
- 1986 Perakim Bashira Hahodit, (Lectures on Indian Poetry), Israeli Ministry of Defence press, Tel Aviv.
- 1990 Songs of the Harsh Devotee: The Tevaram of Cuntaramurttinayanar, Dept. of South Asian Studies, University of Pennsylvania.
- 1993 The Hungry God: Hindu Tales of Filicide and Devotion, University of Chicago Press.ISBN 978-0-226-75571-7
- 1997 (with Don Handelman), God Inside Out. Siva's Game of Dice, Oxford University Press ISBN 978-0-195-35528-4
- 1997 (with Priya Hart), Sanskrit, Language of the Gods, (Hebrew) Magnes Press, Jerusalem
- 1998 (with Velcheru Narayana Rao), A Poem at the Right Moment: Remembered Verses from Premodern South Indiaìì, University of California Press.
- 2001 The Wisdom of Poets: Studies in Tamil, Telugu, and Sanskrit, Oxford University Press, New Delhi.
- 2002 (with Velcheru Narayana Rao and Sanjay Subrahmanyan), Textures of Time: Writing History in South India, Paris, Seuil, Permanent Black, Delhi.
- 2002 (with Velcheru Narayana Rao), Classical Telugu Poetry: An Anthology, University of California Press, Oxford University Press, New Delhi.
- 2002 (with Velcheru Narayana Rao), The Sound of the Kiss, or the Story that Must be Told. Pingali Suranna's Kaḷāpūrṇōdayamu, Columbia University Press.
- 2002 (with Velcheru Narayana Rao), A Lover's Guide to Warangal. The Kridabhiramamu of Vallabharaya, Permanent Black, New Delhi.
- 2004 (with Don Handelman), Siva in the Forest of Pines. An Essay on Sorcery and Self-Knowledge, Oxford University Press.
- 2006 (Translation, with Velcheru Narayana Rao)The Demon's Daughter: A Love Story from South India,(by Piṅgaḷi Sūrana) SUNY Press, Albany.
- 2005 (with Velcheru Narayana Rao), God on the Hill: temple poems from Tirupati, Oxford University Press, New York.
- 2007 Dark Hope: Working for Peace in Israel and Palestine, University of Chicago Press.
- 2008 Spring, Heat, Rains: A South Indian Diary, University of Chicago Press.
- 2011 (with V.K Rajamani) The Mucukunda Murals in the Tyāgarājasvāmi Temple, Prakriti Foundation.
- 2012 (With Velcheru Narayana Rao) Srinatha: The Poet who Made Gods and Kings, Oxford University Press.
- 2012 More Than Real: A History of the Imagination in South India, Harvard University Press.
- 2015 (Translation of Allasani Peddana, with Velcheru Narayana Rao) The Story of Manu. Murti Classical Library of India.
- 2016 Tamil: A Biography. Harvard University Press.
- 2018 Freedom and Despair: Notes from the South Hebron Hills, University of Chicago Press.

He has edited and co-edited several books

- 1984 (with Shmuel Noam Eisenstadt, and Reuven Kahane), Orthodoxy, Heterodoxy and Dissent in India, Mouton, Berlin, New York and Amsterdam.
- 1987 (with Shaul Shaked and G.Stroumsa), Gilgul: Essays in Transformation, Revolution and Permanence in the History of Religions (Festschrift R. J. Zwi Werblowsky), E.J.Brill, Leiden.
- 1995 Syllables of Sky: Studies in South Indian Civilization in Honour of Velcheru Narayana Rao, Oxford University Press, New Delhi.
- 1996 (with Galit Hasan-Rokem), Untying the Knot: On Riddles and Other Enigmatic Modes, Oxford University Press.
- 1999 (with G.Stroumsa), Dream, Cultures: Explorations in the Comparative History of Dreaming, Oxford University Press, New York.
- 2002 (with G.Stroumsa), Self and Self-Transformation in the History of Religions, Oxford University Press, New York.
- 2008 (with Shalva Weil), Karmic Passages: Israeli Scholarships On India, Oxford University Press, New Delhi.
- 2010 Language, Ritual and Poetics in Ancient India and Iran: Studies in Honor of Shaul Migron, The Israel Academy of Sciences and Humanities, Jerusalem.
- 2014, (with Yigal Bronner and Gary Tubb) Innovations and Turning Points: Toward a History of Kavya Literature, Oxford University Press.

=== Critical studies and reviews of Shulman's work ===
Freedom and despair

- Shehadeh, Raja (March 7–20, 2019). "Bearing witness in the West Bank". The New York Review of Books. 66 (4): 33–34.

== Sources ==
- Margalit, Avishai (December 6, 2007). "A Moral Witness to the 'Intricate Machine'". The New York Review of Books. 54 (19).
- Shulman, David Dean (2007). Dark Hope: Working for Peace in Israel and Palestine. Chicago: University of Chicago Press. ISBN 978-0-226-75574-8.
