= Amira Hass =

Israeli journalist and author (born 1956)

- עמירה הס
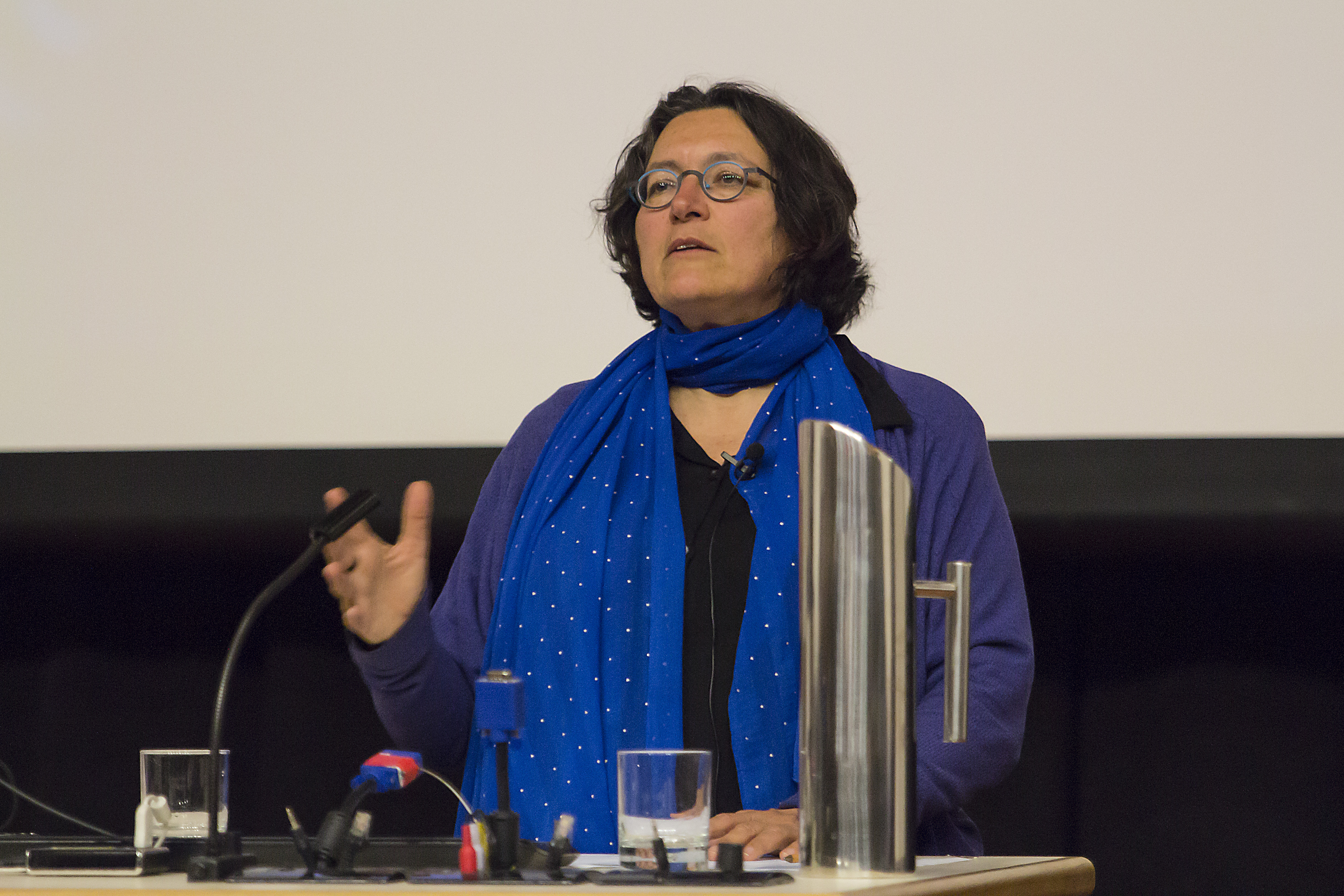
- Amira Hass
- Born: 28 June 1956 (age 70); Jerusalem
- Education: Hebrew University of Jerusalem
- Occupation: Journalist
- Years active: 1989–present
- Employer: Haaretz
- Known for: Coverage of daily life in the Israeli-occupied Palestinian territories

Amira Hass (Hebrew: עמירה הס; born 28 June 1956) is an Israeli journalist, columnist, activist, and author, mostly known for her columns in the daily newspaper Haaretz covering Palestinian affairs in Gaza and the West Bank, where she has lived for almost thirty years.

== Biography ==
Hass was born in Jerusalem, the only child of Holocaust survivor parents. Her mother, Hana, a Bosnian-born Sephardic Jew from Sarajevo, joined the Yugoslav Partisans, and survived nine months in the Bergen-Belsen concentration camp. Her father, Avraham, was a Romanian-born Ashkenazi Jew. In her own words, her parents "were never Zionists, but they found themselves in Israel as refugees after the Holocaust". Both parents were involved in the Communist movement in Israel. Her father was active in the Maki party and was eventually elected to its central committee. Hass was educated at the Hebrew University of Jerusalem, where she studied the history of Nazism and the European Left's relation to the Holocaust.

== Journalism career ==
Frustrated by the events of the First Intifada and by what she considered their inadequate coverage in the Israeli media, she started to report from the Palestinian territories in 1991. As of 2003, she was the only Jewish Israeli journalist who has lived full-time among the Palestinians. She lived in Gaza from 1993 to 1997 and in Ramallah since.

=== Defamation case ===
In June 2001, Judge Rachel Shalev-Gartel of the Jerusalem Magistrate's Court ruled that Hass had defamed the Jewish settler community of Beit Hadassah in Hebron and ordered her to pay 250,000 shekels (about $60,000) in damages. Hass had published accounts by Palestinians that claimed Israeli settlers defiled the body of a Palestinian militant killed by Israeli police; the settlers said that the event did not take place and that Hass had falsely reported the story with malicious intent. The judge found in favour of the settlers, saying that television accounts contradicted Hass's account and ruling that Hass's report damaged that community's reputation. Haaretz indicated that it did not have time to arrange a defense in the case and indicated that it would appeal the decision. Hass said that she had brought forward sourced information from the Palestinian community and said that it was the responsibility of newspaper editors to cross-reference it with other information from the IDF and the settler community.

=== Legal issues ===
On 1 December 2008, Hass, who had traveled to Gaza aboard a protest vessel, had to flee the strip due to threats to her life after she criticized Hamas. She was arrested by Israeli police on her return to Israel for being in Gaza without a permit.

After residing in the Gaza Strip for several months, Hass was again arrested by Israeli police upon her return to Israel on 12 May 2009 "for violating a law which forbids residence in an enemy state".

== Views and opinions ==
Hass identifies as a leftist. In 2011 she joined the Freedom Flotilla II to Gaza. In a speech in Vancouver, when asked whether there is any hope for the region, Hass answered, "Only if we continue to build a bi-national movement against Israeli apartheid."

In 2006 she compared Israeli policies toward the Palestinian population to those of South Africa during apartheid, saying, "The Palestinians, as a people, are divided into subgroups, something which is reminiscent also of South Africa under apartheid rule."

In April 2013 Hass wrote an article in Haaretz defending Palestinian stone-throwing, calling it "the birthright and duty of anyone subject to foreign rule". She was criticized by politician Yossi Beilin and Adva Biton, whose three-year-old daughter was critically injured during a Palestinian rock attack. The Yesha Council filed a complaint with Attorney General Yehuda Weinstein and the police, accusing Hass of incitement to violence because stone throwing "has caused death and serious injuries" to Israelis.

In 2018, Hass suggested that the EU introduce visas for Israeli citizens, asking every applicant whether they had collaborated in war crimes or lived in occupied territory. According to Hass, this would "make Israelis realize that this reality is not normal" and would not be antisemitic, but would benefit Jews in the future, "sav[ing] us from Israeli policies of today".

== Awards and recognition ==
Hass was the recipient of the World Press Freedom Hero award from the International Press Institute in 2000. On 27 June 2001, the Rome-based organization Archivo Disarmo awarded her the Golden Dove of Peace Prize. In 2002, she was honoured with a Prince Claus Award from the Dutch culture and development organisation Prince Claus Fund.

She won the Bruno Kreisky Human Rights Award in 2002, the UNESCO/Guillermo Cano World Press Freedom Prize in 2003 and the inaugural award from the Anna Lindh Memorial Fund in 2004.

In September 2009, Hass received the Hrant Dink International Award, with Alper Görmüş. On 20 October 2009, she received the Lifetime Achievement Award from the International Women's Media Foundation. In December 2009, Hass was awarded the Reporters Without Borders Prize for Press Freedom "for her independent and outspoken reporting from the Gaza Strip for the Israeli daily Ha'aretz during Operation Cast Lead, the offensive which Israel waged against the territory from 27 December 2008 to 18 January 2009".

Hass won the 2024 Columbia Journalism Award and was the commencement speaker for the Columbia University Graduate School of Journalism on 15 May 2024.

== Published works ==
- Drinking the Sea at Gaza: Days and Nights in a Land under Siege. Owl Books. 2000. ISBN 0-8050-5740-4.
- (With Rachel Leah Jones) Reporting from Ramallah: An Israeli Journalist in an Occupied Land (Semiotext(e), 2003) ISBN 1-58435-019-9.
- Diary of Bergen-Belsen: 1944–1945. Haymarket Books. 2009. ISBN 978-1-931859-87-5. A new English language translation of her Sephardi Yugoslav mother Hanna Levy-Hass' 1946 memoir, with addition of Hass' foreword and afterwords.
