= Hathaleen =

Hathaleen, Hadalin, Hadaleen, Hathalin or Hthaleen (Arabic: الهذالين, romanized: al-Haḏḏālīn) is a Palestinian surname. Notable people with the surname include:

- Awdah Hathaleen (1994–2025), Palestinian activist and murder victim
- Eid Hathaleen (born 1983 or 1984), Palestinian artist and activist, cousin of Awdah

== See also ==
- Hadalin
