= Land expropriation in the West Bank =

Israeli practices in seizing Palestinian owned land in the West Bank

Land expropriation in the West Bank refers to the practices employed by the State of Israel to take over Palestinian land in the occupied West Bank. From 1969 to 2019 Israel had issued over 1,150 military seizure orders alone to that purpose.

== Overview ==
The mechanisms by which Israel seizes or expropriates West Bank land were set forth in a detailed work by B'Tselem in 2002 and many practices outlined there were confirmed in the official Israeli Sasson Report of 2005, which focused on government subsidies and support for the creation of illegal Israeli outposts in knowing contravention of Israel's own laws. (Note: "Sasson implicated the full range of authorities—military and civilian—in breaking the law and pointed to the Civil Administration of the OPT as the hub of illegality." (Shafir 2017, pp. 74–75, 74)) This was done after the government had officially frozen new settlements, in both the Oslo Accords and an undertaking by Ariel Sharon.

=== Mechanisms ===
According to the analysis made by B'Tselem in 2002, there have been five mechanisms adopted to take over Palestinian land.

==== Seizure for Military Needs ====
According to Customary international humanitarian law, the expropriation of residents' property by an occupying power is prohibited, except for temporary possession. Israel justified its initial requisitions of West Bank land as necessary for urgent military needs. Much private land was seized and expropriated nonetheless to create settlements, and justified on the grounds that even civilian settlements strengthen the security of an area. A High Court decision regarding Elon Moreh then banned this sequester of private Palestinian land for settlements. Subsequently, however expropriations continued, to build numerous bypass roads to settlements, with security needs cited, and this was endorsed by the Israeli court as legitimate. According to a 2019 study by Dror Etkes, military seizure orders, based on military and security requirements, have resulted in the expropriation of over 100,000 dunams (25,000 acres) of Palestinian land. 40% of such temporary requisitions have then been turned over to settlements. Down to 1977, 28% of the ruling Labour Government's orders were used for settlement, while after the Likud party's victory, from 1977 to 1979, the figure ran to 73%.

==== Employment of the Ottoman Law Code of 1858 ====
Israel's solution adopted in the wake of this legal precedent, which might have thwarted further settlement, was to cite the Ottoman Land Law of 1858 to justify the seizure of 40% of the West Bank on the grounds that the terrain was "state land". Israel's justification here was posited on its interpretations of articles 43 and 55 of the 1907 Hague Regulations and a 1967 order to possess and manage at the military commander's discretion "enemy property," namely Jordan's. (Jordan had annexed the West Bank in 1950, which Israel captured from Jordan in 1967). The first seizure took over 13% of the West Bank, and then the possession of lands in Ottoman law which the Israeli authorities identified as certain varieties of miri and mawat land, which altogether amounted to 26% of the West Bank. This ensured a huge reserve for future settlement. In seeking legal redress for such expropriations, the burden of proof lay on Palestinian plaintiffs. Palestinians in practice had often avoided registering their property under the Ottomans, preferring their local collective ownership system (musha'a), thus evading Ottoman taxes and army drafts. Even if the burden of proof of ownership is met, the appeal may be denied if the Israeli custodian had in the meantime transferred the land to a settlement.

The precise extent of Islamic Waqf lands – Islamic property held in sacred trust for religious purposes – in 1967 is unknown but in 1992 Michael Dumper calculated West Bank waqf properties extended over 600,000 dunams. By 2013, the Israeli occupation authorities were estimated to have expropriated more than 104,996 dunams of waqf holdings, mostly around Jericho. Israel seized, by declaring it state land, even non-arable hilltop land used by pastoralists. The lands of the village of Umm al-Khair were expropriated in this way. (Note: Speaking of one family among the tens of thousands of Bedouins expelled from the Negev by Israel in 1948, Ben Ehrenreich writes: "Eid's grandfather...brought his family and his flocks to the rocky hilltop called Umm al-Kheir, which translates roughly as 'Mother of Goodness'. He purchased the land for the price of one hundred camels from farmers who lived in Yatta, the nearest city of any size. But when the Israelis occupied the West Bank in 1967, they began to selectively apply certain Jordanian laws based in the Ottoman Land Code of 1858, which ruled that any acreage left uncultivated for three consecutive years – hilltops were rarely farmed – would revert to the state, which could transfer the land to private owners, meaning settlers. In this way, Israel had confiscated nearly 40 percent of the West Bank's landmass by the early 1990s." (Ehrenreich 2016, p. 292))

==== Absentee Property ====
Palestinian property owned but abandoned before, during, or after the 1967 war is administered by the Custodian for Abandoned Property- its trustee, on behalf of the IDF, until the owner returns. In practice repatriation of absentee owners is generally prohibited. Even if an appellant can prove he owns this land, and is resident in the West Bank, he cannot retake possession if in the meantime the Custodian has allowed it to be settled, as in the case of Beit Horon. In the Burqan case, where the plaintiff Mohammad Burqan's legal title to his former house in the Jewish Quarter was recognized, the Israeli Supreme Court rejected his request to be allowed to return to his home on the grounds that the area it was located in had "special historical significance" for Jews.

==== Expropriation for Public Needs ====
Jordanian law required intended appropriations of property to be gazetted to allow land owners 15 days to appeal. Israel adopted part of this law dealing with urgent expropriations for the public weal, modifying the general thrust by cancelling the provision regarding prior notification which remained in effect for 12 years. Any appeal, in Jordanian law under the jurisdiction of a local court, was to be made before the Israeli military commander. On appeal, Israel then was obliged to notify, but did so only to the local mukhtar, not to the person(s) affected. This, with the exception of Ma'ale Adumim, has been used to expropriate land for the road network servicing settlements, which Israel justified by claiming in court they also serviced local Palestinian needs. Of 40,000 dunams redefined for allocation to 45 settlements, in one study of 73 seizure orders, less than half (43%) is actually used for built-up areas or in settlement agriculture. The remaining 57% percent, technically Palestinian land under temporary requisition for military purposes, stands empty. Since a court judgement in 1989, seized land must bear an expiration date for the appropriation. On expiry, new orders are issued to enable extensions.

==== Acquisition of Land on the Free Market ====
Military order no.25 placed severe restrictions on land sales in the West Bank and for a decade only the Jewish National Fund engaged in purchases. It is forbidden under Palestinian law and custom to sell land to Jews, a fact which entailed creating a variety of methods to transfer property without the sale being visible for long periods. Thereafter, changes in the law introduced by Likud created hundreds of cases of fraudulent sales, – with numerous Palestinians finding the land they worked apparently sold only when they observed tractors at work on the properties – a practice formally stopped in 1985.

== 1967 to recent times ==
In the wake of the 1967 war, especially under the Likud governments (1977–1984), apart from expropriation, land requisitioning, zoning regulations and some purchases, Israel introduced legal definitions of what was to be regarded as "public" and what "private" land in the conquered territories.

With Military Order Number 59 issued on 31 July 1967 the Israeli commander asserted that therein state land would be whatever land had belonged to the enemy (Jordan) or its judicial bodies. Sweeping restrictions were imposed requiring military authorization for any land transactions. Rather than assuming the task of being the custodian of that property until the occupation ended, Israel chose to transfer the use of unregistered land to Jewish settlers, and on that basis, from 1967 to 1984 the Israeli government requisitioned an estimated 5,500,000 dunams, or roughly half of the total area of the West Bank, setting aside much of the land for military training and camping areas. By defining such areas as "state land" its use by Palestinians was precluded. The first wave of land confiscations outside Jerusalem's walls began in January 1968, when 3,800 dunums of private Palestinian land were expropriated for Kalandia industrial park and to enable the building of 6,000 apartments in the areas of French Hill and Ramat Eshkol. By 1983 the expropriation was calculated to extend over 52% of the territory, most of its prime agricultural land and, just before the 1993 Oslo Accords, these confiscations had encompassed over three quarters of the West Bank.

Many of these early expropriations took place over private Palestinian land. This led to a complaint over a settlement at Elon Moreh, and the Supreme Court ruled such practices were forbidden except for military purposes, civilians only being permitted on what Israel defined as "state land". This ruling actually enhanced the settlement project since anywhere Israelis settled automatically became a security zone requiring the military to guarantee their safety.

One technique used in the Jordan Valley to gain more land is via the declaration of Israeli firing zones (35% of the area) which require residents working the land to evacuate temporarily.

From January 2013 to 2017, 140 orders were issued to have communities leave their homes, with their flocks, sometimes in mid-winter. In addition water tankers, pipelines for spring water, solar panels and farm machinery are confiscated causing upheavals in their local economy and persistent insecurity about their future. The Israeli settlements occupy no more than 0.0041% of the Jordan Valley and northern Dead Sea but the land allocated for their future use as municipal areas is 28 times greater, covering 11.8% of the total area.

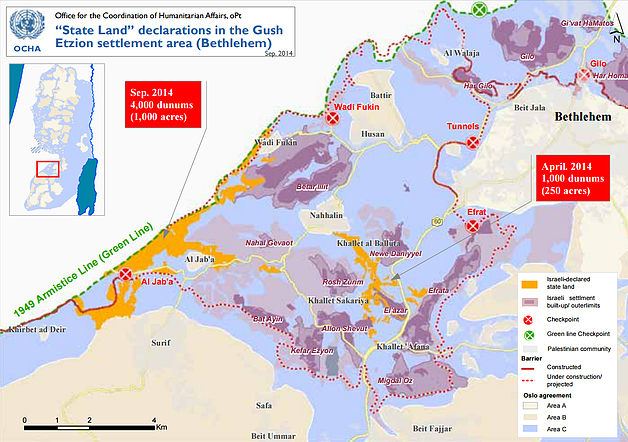
"State Land" declarations in the Gush Etzion settlement area (Bethlehem)

Ariel was initially built on 462 hectares originally seized for security reasons. On the three successive occasions when security fences have been raised, they have incorporated hundreds of dunams of private Palestinian agricultural property. Land where pastoralists from Marda used to graze 10,000 animals were taken, leaving the village with land that can barely carry 100 head of livestock. Likewise at Tel Rumeida in 2015, a military closure guaranteed settlers free passage while Palestinians are denied access to visit those residents who remain. Another technique used was to offer a Palestinian proprietor a temporary swap, in which he leased his land for 3 years in exchange for a lease on absentee-owned land in the hands of the Israeli custodian. Such leases were not renewed after expiry, but, as with the case of Mehola, the Palestinian property leased became a permanent Israeli asset, while the absentee property offered in exchange technically could revert to its original owners if they returned (from Jordan) leaving the original Palestinian party to the contract landless. One innovative technique in 1999 came from settlers complaining of poor cellphone reception. They pointed out a nearby hill, which they had unsuccessfully tried to colonize earlier, as an appropriate site for antennae. It was a biblical site, moreover, they claimed, though excavations only yielded Byzantine ruins. The IDF declared the antennae would pose a security issue, and then expropriated the site from its owners, the villagers of Burqa and Ein Yabrud, who grazed sheep and cultivated figs and grapes there. Settlers then moved in and established the illegal outpost of Migron. Using the Ottoman law code regarding miri lands (only 4% of the land north of Beersheva), which held that if were not worked for 3 consecutive years without a lawful excuse they reverted to the state, Israel dispossessed, by declaring it state land, even non-arable hilltop land used by pastoralists. The lands of the village of Umm al-Khair were expropriated in this way. (Note: Speaking of one family among the tens of thousands of Bedouins expelled from the Negev by Israel in 1948, Ben Ehrenreich writes: "Eid's grandfather...brought his family and his flocks to the rocky hilltop called Umm al-Kheir, which translates roughly as 'Mother of Goodness'. He purchased the land for the price of one hundred camels from farmers who lived in Yatta, the nearest city of any size. But when the Israelis occupied the West Bank in 1967, they began to selectively apply certain Jordanian laws based in the Ottoman Land Code of 1858, which ruled that any acreage left uncultivated for three consecutive years–hilltops were rarely farmed–would revert to the state, which could transfer the land to private owners, meaning settlers. In this way, Israel had confiscated nearly 40 percent of the West Bank's landmass by the early 1990s." (Ehrenreich 2016, p. 292)) In the Burqan case, where the plaintiff Mohammad Burqan's legal title to his former house in the Jewish Quarter was recognized, the Israeli Supreme Court rejected his request to be allowed to return to his home on the grounds that the area it was located in had "special historical significance" for Jews.

The precise extent of Islamic Waqf lands – Islamic property held in sacred trust for religious purposes – in 1967 is unknown but in 1992 Michael Dumper calculated West Bank waqf properties extended over 600,000 dunams. By 2013, Israeli authorities were estimated to have expropriated more than 104,996 dunams of waqf holdings, mostly around Jericho.

== Legal redress ==
Legal redress for expropriated land exists, but the process can prove lengthy, and financially and mentally exhausting for villagers. Israeli human rights activists who try to encourage harassed Palestinians to resist expropriation, such as David Dean Shulman, rabbi Arik Ascherman, Amiel Vardi and Ezra Nawi have often been beaten up by settlers who regard them as "Nazis". Nawi himself has been imprisoned.

== Sources ==
- Abowd, Thomas Philip (2000). "The Moroccan Quarter: A History of the Present" (PDF). Jerusalem Quarterly (7). Institute for Palestine Studies: 6–16.
- Algazy, Joseph (Spring–Summer 1985). "Israeli Settlement Policy in the West Bank and the Gaza Strip". Arab Studies Quarterly. 7 (2–3): 62–73. JSTOR 41857769.
- Braverman, Irus (September 2008). ""The Tree Is the Enemy Soldier": A Sociolegal Making of War Landscapes in the Occupied West Bank". Law & Society Review. 42 (3): 449–482. doi:10.1111/j.1540-5893.2008.00348.x. JSTOR 29734134.
- Braverman, Irus (November 2009). "Uprooting Identities: The Regulation of Olive Trees in the Occupied West Bank". Political and Legal Anthropology Review. 32 (2): 237–264. doi:10.1111/j.1555-2934.2009.01061.x. JSTOR 24497464.
- Ehrenreich, Ben (2016). The Way to the Spring: Life and Death in Palestine. Granta Books. ISBN 978-1-783-78312-0.
- Galnoor, Itzhak (2010). Public Management in Israel: Development, Structure, Functions and Reforms. Routledge. ISBN 978-1-136-92386-9.
- Hareuveni, Eyal (May 2011). Dispossession and Exploitation: Israel's Policy in the Jordan Valley and Northern Dead Sea (PDF). B'Tselem.
- Hass, Amira (12 March 2019). "How Palestinian Land Goes From the Israeli Army to the Settlers". Haaretz.
- "Israel and Occupied Palestinian Territories" (PDF). Amnesty International Report 2017/18: The State of the World's Human Rights. Amnesty International. 2018. pp. 207–211. ISBN 978-0-86210-499-3.
- "The Jordan Valley". B'Tselem. 11 November 2017.
- Kadri, Ali (Autumn 1998). "A Survey of Commuting Labor from the West Bank to Israel". Middle East Journal. 52 (4): 517–530. JSTOR 4329251.
- Lein, Yehezkel; Weizman, Eyal (May 2002). "Land Grab: Israel's Settlement Policy in the West Bank" (PDF). B'Tselem Report. B'Tselem. ISSN 0793-520X.
- Lustick, Ian (2018). Unsettled States, Disputed Lands: Britain and Ireland, France and Algeria, Israel and the West Bank-Gaza. Cornell University Press. ISBN 978-1-501-73194-5.
- Matar, Ibrahim (Autumn 1981). "Israeli Settlements in the West Bank and Gaza Strip". Journal of Palestine Studies. 11 (1): 93–110. doi:10.2307/2536048. JSTOR 2536048.
- Musaee, Anwar H. M; Abbas, Eeman Muhammad; Mujan, Wan Kamal; Sidik, Roziah (2014). "Waqf Land in the West Bank and Investment Current State of Affairs". Asian Social Science. 10 (14): 23–39. doi:10.5539/ass.v10n14p23 – via ResearchGate.
- Nicoletti, Claudia; Hearne, Anne-Maria (2012). Pillage of the Dead Sea: Israel's Unlawful Exploitation of Natural Resources in the Occupied Palestinian Territories. Al-Haq. ISBN 978-9-950-32734-4. Archived from the original on 31 January 2020.
- "Occupation, Inc. How Settlement Businesses Contribute to Israel's Violations of Palestinian Rights". Human Rights Watch. 19 January 2016.
- Playfair, Emma (Fall 1988). "Israel's Security Needs in the West Bank, Real and Contrived". Arab Studies Quarterly. 10 (4): 406–423. JSTOR 41857980.
- Shafir, Gershon (2017). A Half Century of Occupation: Israel, Palestine, and the World's Most Intractable Conflict. University of California Press. ISBN 978-0-520-29350-2.
- Shehadeh, Raja (Spring–Summer 1985b). "Some Legal Aspects of Israeli Land Policy in the Occupied Territories". Arab Studies Quarterly. 7 (2–3): 42–61. JSTOR 41857768.
- Shulman, David D. (2018). Freedom and Despair: Notes from the South Hebron Hills. University of Chicago Press. ISBN 978-0-226-56665-8.
- Stein, Kenneth W. (2017). The Land Question in Palestine, 1917-1939. University of North Carolina Press. ISBN 978-1-469-61725-1.
- Weizman, Eyal (2012). Hollow Land: Israel's Architecture of Occupation. Verso Books. ISBN 978-1-844-67915-7.
- World Bank (22 September 2008). Palestinian Economic Prospects: Aid, Access and Reform (PDF). World Bank.
