= Eid Hathaleen =

Palestinian artist and activist (born 1983 or 1984)

- عيد الهذالين
- Born: Eid Suleiman Hathaleen; 1983 or 1984 (age 41–42); Umm al-Khair, Hebron Governorate, Palestine
- Occupation: Artist
- Relatives: Awdah Hathaleen (cousin)

Eid Suleiman Hathaleen (also Hadaleen or Hthaleen; Arabic: عيد سليمان الهذالين, romanized: ʿĪd Sulaymān al-Haḏḏālīn; born 1983 or 1984) is a Palestinian artist and activist.

== Early and personal life ==
Hathaleen was born and raised in the village of Umm al-Khair in Hebron Governorate, Palestine, where he attended an UNRWA school. His father, Suleiman Eid, was a shepherd and his mother was a homemaker. His family belongs to a Bedouin tribe from Beersheba who was expelled by Israeli forces in 1948. In January 2022, Hadaleen's father was killed after being hit by an Israeli police vehicle; no one was convicted for his murder. On 28 July 2025, Hathaleen's cousin Awdah, also a prominent activist, was killed by Israeli settler Yinon Levi, who did not face any charges. Hathaleen mourned his loss, describing his cousin to Al Jazeera as a "truly beloved" relative, and stating that "There was [nobody] who contributed as much to the community in Umm al-Khair as Awdah... I can't believe that tomorrow I will wake up and Awdah won't be here."

Hathaleen is married and has two daughters. As of July 2012, he was a vegetarian and a tai chi practitioner, and was fluent in Hebrew and English.

== Art career ==
Hadaleen's work consists mainly of sculptures, normally model vehicles created from scrap metal, plastic bottles, wire, and other collected materials. He was interested in model-building from age 12, but was not encouraged by his community, who saw it as a waste of time. In 2007, during an economically and emotionally difficult time, he destroyed his sculptures.

He returned to art two years later, when he made his first found materials sculpture, of a Sikorsky CH-53E Super Stallion helicopter, in 2009. In 2012, he explained his choice to build model bulldozers, which are frequently used to destroy Palestinian homes, saying "I think this tool serves human beings...the tool has no soul; the man who sits inside and drives it decides how it will be used," and that "to build it is to say to people that it’s not the tool that causes trouble". He has leaned into his models resemblance to toys, emphasizing that they are tools wielded by people who must take responsibility for their actions. He has also built trucks and tractors. Each sculpture takes about a month to construct.

In 2011, Hadaleen's construction process was documented in the short stop-motion film Eid, produced by the Saaheb Collective and Israeli filmmaker David Massey. In May 2012, Hadaleen joined Massey for the film's showing at the Palestine Film Festival at the Barbican Centre in London, the United Kingdom.

In 2016, Hadaleen met Chinese artist Ai Weiwei, who invited Hathaleen to exhibit his work in Berlin, Germany later that year at the Aedes Architecture Forum.

== Activism and arrests ==
As of July 2012, Hadaleen performed part-time work for the HALO Trust, a group which works to clear landmines.

In February 2024, Hadaleen was detained by IDF forces for multiple hours, but was not charged with anything. The following July, his home in Umm al-Khair was bulldozed by Israeli forces.

On 11 June 2025, Hadaleen and his cousin Awdah flew to the United States on tourist visas, with plans to speak with organizations on their experiences in Palestine. The two were detained upon their arrival at San Francisco International Airport, with a Customs and Border Protection official later saying their visas had been cancelled; no reason as to why was provided. Supporters of the pair, including representatives of Kehilla Community Synagogue, began protests outside the airport on the morning of 12 June. The pair were ultimately deported on the afternoon of 12 June.
