= Beita =

Beita may refer to:

- Beita, Nablus, Palestinian town in the Nablus Governorate, West Bank
  - Beita incident, killings that took place in Beita, Nablus
- Steven Beitashour, Iranian footballer

== China ==
- Beita District (北塔区), Shaoyang, Hunan
- Beita Subdistrict, Chaoyang, Liaoning (北塔街道), in Shuangta District
- Beita Subdistrict, Shenyang (北塔街道), in Huanggu District, Shenyang, Liaoning
- Beita station, in Huanggu District, Shenyang
