= Killing of Awdah Hathaleen =

2025 shooting in the Hebron Hills, Palestine

- Part of Israeli settler violence during the Gaza war
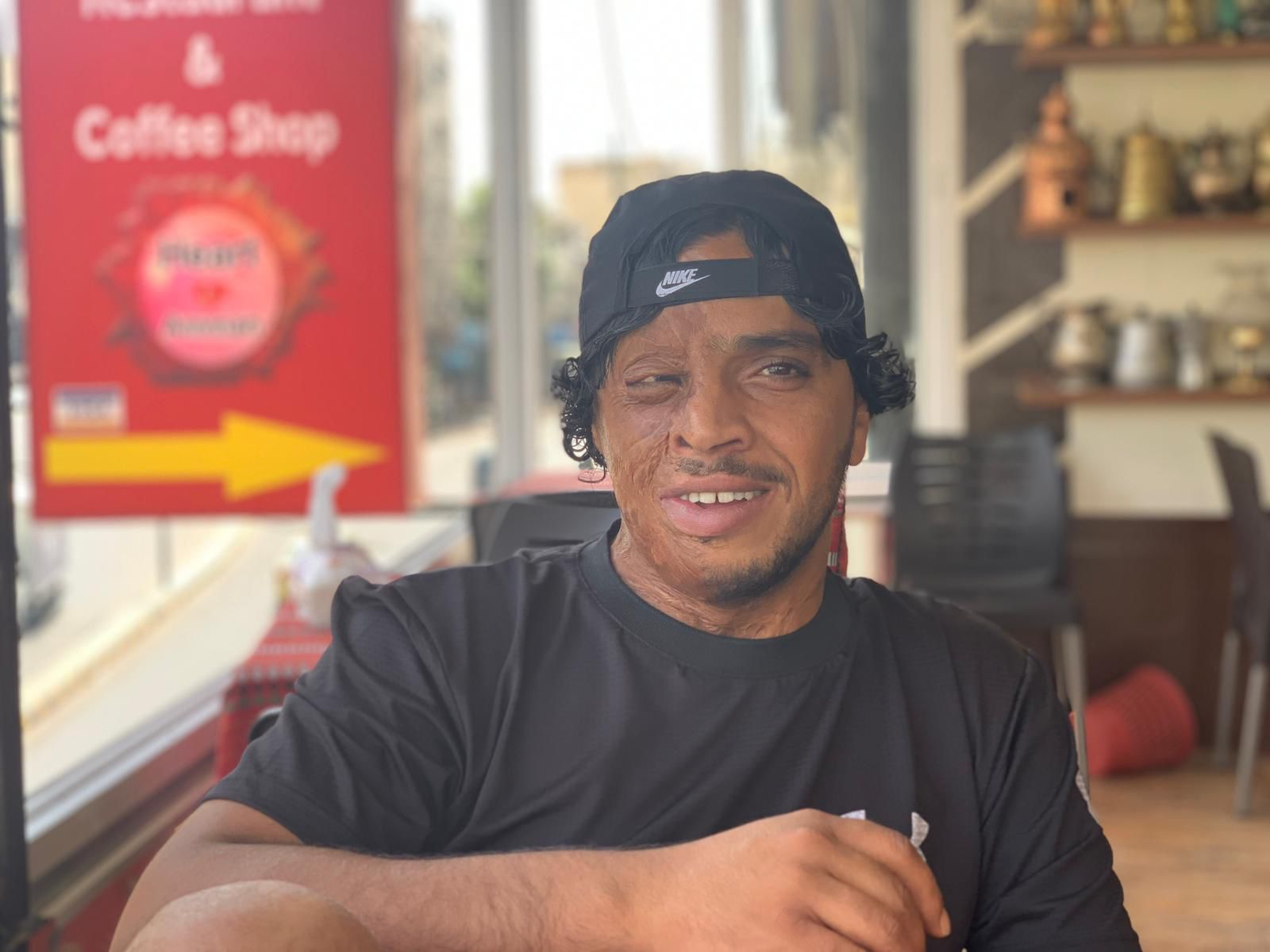
- Hathaleen in 2025
- Location: 31°25′30″N 35°11′46″E; Umm al-Khair, Hebron, occupied West Bank, Palestine
- Date: July 28, 2025
- Attack type: Shooting
- Weapon: 9mm Glock semi-automatic handgun
- Deaths: 1
- Victim: Awdah Hathaleen
- Perpetrator: Yinon Levi
- Charges: Reckless homicide; Armed trespassing; Malicious property damage
- Convicted: None
- Judge: Chavi Toker

On July 28, 2025, Awdah Hathaleen, a Palestinian activist and consultant on the 2024 documentary No Other Land, was shot and killed by Israeli settler Yinon Levi in the village of Umm al-Khair in the South Hebron Hills, West Bank. The killing was filmed by several of the village's residents and Hathaleen himself, showing Levi opening fire on the community. The killing was widely condemned by the international community and human rights groups amidst continuing settler violence in the occupied territory since the start of the Gaza war. One year later, Levi was indicted on charges of reckless homicide.

== Victim ==
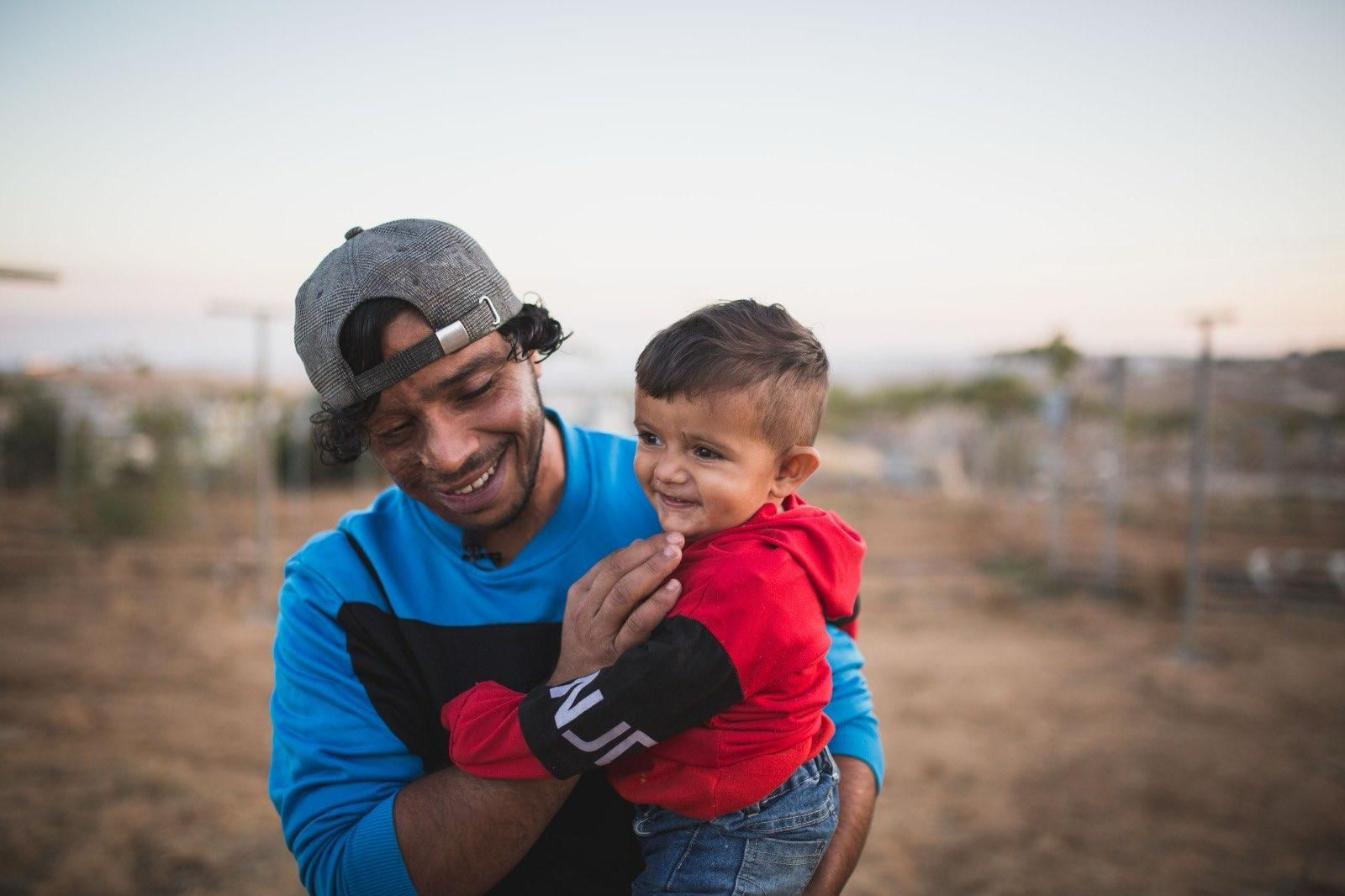
Hathaleen with his son Watan in 2024

Odeh Muhammad Khalil al-Hathalin (Arabic: عودة محمد خليل الهذالين, romanized: ʿAwdah Muḥammad Ḫalīl al-Haḏḏālīn; born 1994 in Umm al-Khair), more commonly known as Awdah Hathaleen or sometimes as Odeh Hadalin, was an English teacher and activist against Israeli settler violence.

Born and raised in a Bedouin tribe from Beersheba who were expelled by Israeli forces in 1948, Hathaleen received his primary education in local schools, despite inadequate facilities and access hindered by the Israel Defense Forces (IDF) deployed in the West Bank. Developing an interest in foreign languages since an early age, he pursued a bachelor's degree in English from Hebron University in 2016, going on to become a teacher at Al-Saray'a Secondary School in Badia, which he had attended himself.

After becoming an activist at age of 17, Hathaleen emerged as a recognizable spokesperson for the people of Umm al-Khair, often receiving foreign diplomats, journalists and fellow activists. From 2019 to 2023, he collaborated in the filming of the Oscar-winning documentary No Other Land, which focused on the threats that Israeli expansionism and settler violence pose to the Palestinian community of Masafer Yatta, located near Hathaleen's hometown. He was a volunteer with the Israeli human rights organization B'Tselem, and had been a contributor to +972 Magazine since 2021.

Hathaleen was also a soccer fan (particularly of Real Madrid), and played with the local Masafer Yatta and Susiya amateur clubs, believing sport to be a means to foster peaceful resistance against the Israeli occupation. He had been married since 2019 to 24-year-old Hanady, and had three children – Watan (5 years old), Muhammad (4 years old) and Kinan (7 months old). In 2022, his uncle Suleiman was run over and killed by an Israeli police tow truck. No one was convicted for the killing.

The month before his death, Hathaleen and his cousin, Eid Hathaleen, had been scheduled to speak in a number of cities in the San Francisco Bay Area on an interfaith speaking tour. However, they were not permitted to leave San Francisco International Airport, and were then both deported to Qatar by U.S. Customs and Border Protection. During the last three years of his life, he was also involved with an Italian foundation for youth education, taking part in camps in Castiglione della Pescaia, Tuscany.

== Killing ==
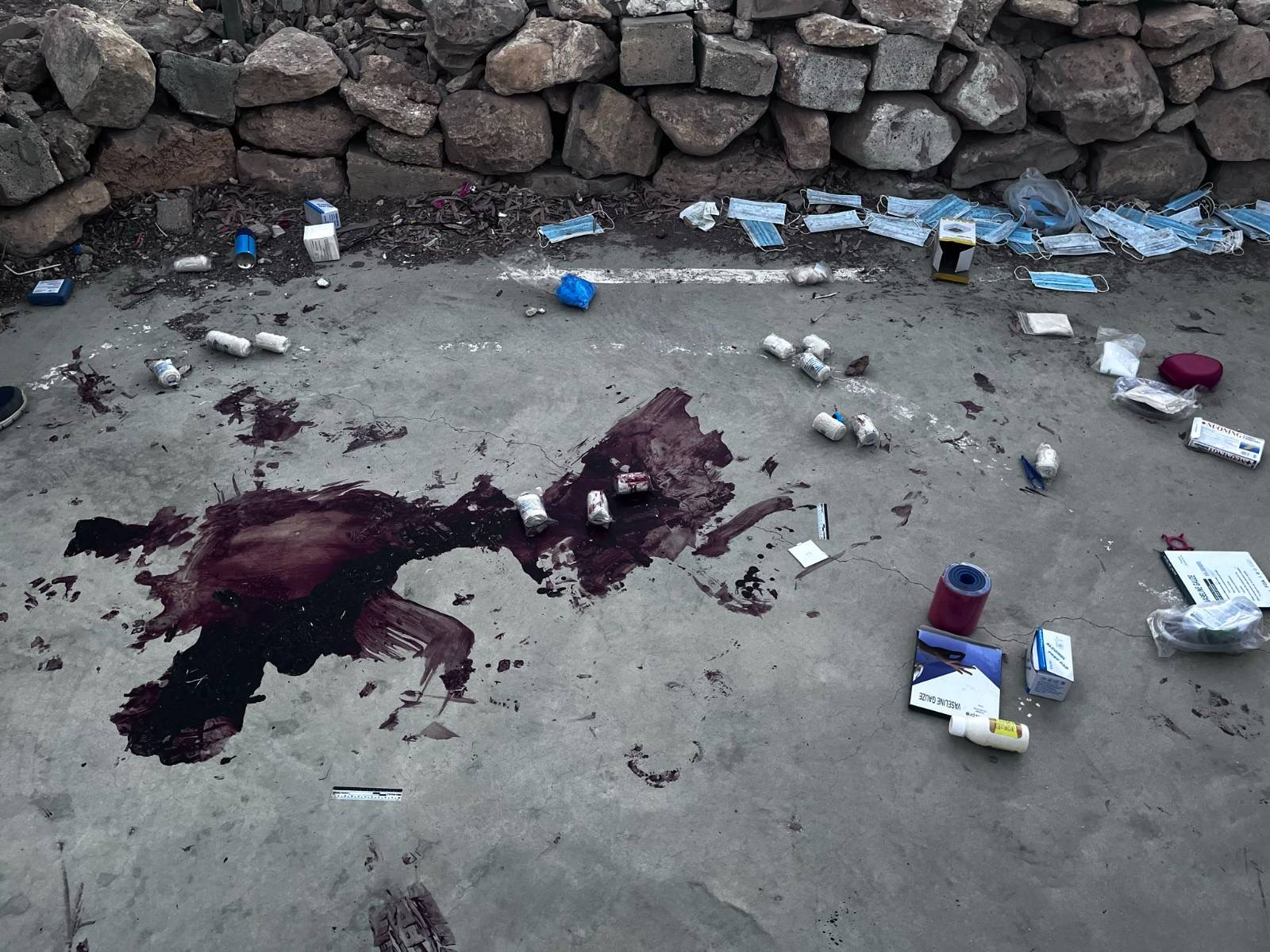
Bloodstain at the scene of the killing of Awdah Hathaleen

On July 28, 2025, No Other Land director Yuval Abraham stated on Twitter that Hathaleen had been fatally shot in the lungs by an Israeli settler in his village of Umm al-Khair.

While an Israeli excavator is working on land in Area C, Yinon Levi threatens Palestinian residents who are protesting and then opens fire.

According to local activists, the killing took place after earlier clashes that day, when settlers from the Havat Meitarim outpost near Khirbet Zanuta had begun to create earthworks in a "state land" area with water and electricity pipelines for Umm al-Khair, and village residents demanded that they move to another site. Upon finishing the earthworks, a settler drove his excavator through a private olive grove in Umm al-Khair, damaging property and land. After the settler knocked unconscious villager Ahmad al-Hathaleen, who had intervened, with the excavator's hammer, other residents began to throw stones at him, prompting a second Israeli settler to come forth and start shooting.

Hathaleen's cousin Alaa, who witnessed the killing, reported that the settler "immediately started firing randomly at everyone" despite being warned that children were present, and that he slapped Hathaleen's mother to the ground after she protested the shooting. Israeli-American activist Mattan Berner-Kadish, who was also present at the scene, recounted that the shooter immediately commented "I'm glad I did it," and that three IDF soldiers wished it had been one of them to fire at Hathaleen. The IDF described the incident as "terrorists ... hurling stones at Israeli civilians near the area of Carmel in Judea."

After the shooting, Yinon Levi gives his account of what happened to Israeli soldiers, who speak with him without restraining him. At the same time, soldiers arrest Palestinians.

The perpetrator was identified by Abraham and the village's residents as Israeli settler Yinon Levi, the founder of Havat Meitarim, who was under sanctions by the United Kingdom and European Union and had previously been sanctioned by the US under the Biden administration for repeated attacks at local Palestinian communities; the latter sanctions were lifted by the Trump administration. A video captured on July 28 showed Levi wildly firing his gun at the village's residents at the time of Hathaleen's killing, confirming the witnesses' account.

Hathaleen was rushed to Soroka Hospital in Beersheba, where he arrived without pulse and was pronounced dead of his wounds.

== Aftermath ==
The day following the killing, an Israeli court upheld Levi's claims that he was acting in "self-defense" and put him on house arrest for three days, after which he was released. Concurrently, Israeli police forces, presenting a closed military zone order, stormed the mourning tent, as well as throwing stun grenades, raiding family homes multiple times, conducting fourteen arbitrary arrests and beating residents, according to testimonies.

After the autopsy, the police withheld Hathaleen's body. They said they would release it if the family signed a document with 10 conditions for his funeral, which included limiting the ceremony to a maximum of 15 attendees – a number lower than that of his closest relatives – and burying him outside his village. Israeli authorities maintained that such conditions were necessary to preserve public order, while family friend Karin Wind commented that the purpose was to make it seem "like it never happened and nobody [would] come."

The corpse was ultimately released on August 7, with the IDF agreeing for its burial in Umm al-Khair instead of Yatta or Hebron, as they had requested earlier. However, in violation of the agreement, the army barred non-residents from attending the funeral, placing checkpoints around the village; notwithstanding that, several dozen people were present. The last Palestinian detainees were also released on August 7.

Judge Chavi Toker from the Jerusalem Magistrates Court rejected a request from the police to extend Levi's house arrest until August 9, on the grounds that testimonies from local activists against Levi actually "strengthened" his claims that he had not fired from a short distance – it has been reported that Hathaleen was 10–15 metres (33–49 ft) away; the police appealed the decision, to no avail. As of 4 August 2025, Levi was already at large doing earthworks in his settlement of Carmel, while some of Hathaleen's relatives remained imprisoned and his body was not returned until three days later.

An American nurse who had attempted to revive Hathaleen by administering CPR was detained by Israeli authorities for 24 hours after the shooting, alongside Italian citizen Micol Hassan. After being ordered to report to another police outpost, she was deported to Jordan; Hassan was also deported upon release. The nurse also claimed that while several village residents sat on the station's floor blindfolded and with their hands zip-tied, Levi was freely walking around and sharing cigarettes with the police officers.

On August 5, settlers ultimately cut off a water pipe under the protection of the Israel Border Police, forcing around twenty families from Umm al-Khair to go without water supply for five days.

On February 15, 2026, over six months after the killing, Israeli newspaper Haaretz reported that the State Attorney's Office intended to file an indictment against Yinon Levi on charges of reckless homicide, which can lead to a maximum sentence of 12 years although under Israeli law it is not as grave of a charge as murder. On August 6, 2026, a year after the events, Israeli prosecutors indicted Levi for reckless manslaughter, armed trespassing and malicious property damage. According to the human rights group B'Tselem, this marked the first time an Israeli had been charged in such an incident since the onset of the Gaza war, despite the UN-recorded 1,100 Palestinian victims (240 of them children) in the occupied West Bank in that period. Israeli prosecutors rarely hold settlers accountable for their violence, with an estimated 93.6% of cases of settler violence against Palestinians ending without prosecution.

A football pitch was built in Umm al-Khair in honor of Hathaleen, who was a fan of the sport. Pro-Israeli settler organization Regavim submitted a petition that the pitch was a "security threat" to the Carmel settlement, and Israeli settlers surrounded the pitch with Israeli flags. In February 2026, the Israeli government delivered a demolition order for the pitch.

== Reactions ==
Several activists who were friends with Hathaleen publicly mourned his death, including Yuval Abraham, Mattan Berner-Kadish, Rabbi Lev Taylor, Danielle Bett, Andrey X and Giacomo Mininni. Many of his friends remembered him as an advocate for nonviolence in spite of increasingly widespread and systematic Israeli settler violence, which forces Palestinians in the West Bank to leave their hometowns.

The French foreign ministry denounced Hathaleen's killing as an act of murder and settler violence as "a matter of terrorism", and called on the Israeli authorities to hold the perpetrator responsible. Amnesty International denounced the killing, writing that it was "a devastating tragedy and a brutal reminder of the relentless violence faced by Palestinian communities in the occupied West Bank", and that the "deliberate failure of Israeli authorities to conduct genuine and impartial investigations into settler attacks against Palestinians demands immediate and independent international investigations into this killing and other such attacks against Palestinians in the occupied West Bank, including East Jerusalem."

Jewish Voice for Peace also denounced Hathaleen's killing, writing on Instagram that it was a result of "brutal settler violence", and that as an organization they would "reject settler violence and expansion" and recommit themselves "to the courageous, loving resistance that Awda embodied – a spirit that inspired all who had the privilege of knowing him." On August 10, B'Tselem released a video, filmed by Hathaleen himself, documenting his last moments before being hit by Levi's bullet and falling to the ground; the group denounced the impunity of settlers and the systemic violence inflicted on Palestinians.

After the kidnapping of Hathaleen's body by Israeli troops, around seventy local women – including his wife Hanady, mother Khadra and sister Sara – went on a hunger strike until the body was returned and the Palestinian detainees were released. This pressured Israeli authorities to agree to return the body by August 7. With some of its members still detained, Hathaleen's family proclaimed three days of mourning, calling for international solidarity to enforce accountability; all detainees were released within that date.

== See also ==
- Israeli apartheid
- Israeli war crimes in the Gaza war
- List of Israeli price tag attacks
- Racism in Israel
- Zionist political violence
