= Khirbet Tana et-Tahta =

Village and archeological site located in the West Bank

- Tana et-Tahta
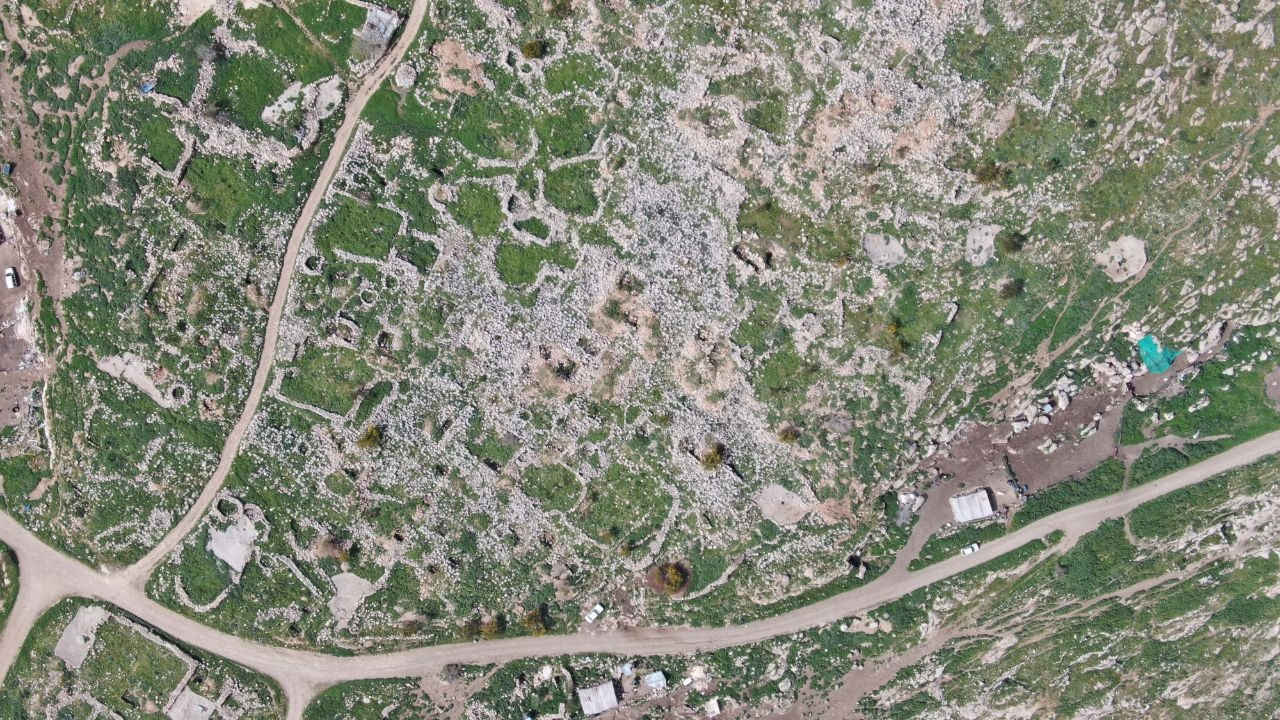
- Aerial view of Tana et-Tahta

- Location within the West Bank
- 32.152418°N 35.395459°E
- Type: settlement
- Periods: Iron Age, Roman period, Byzantine period
- Cultures: Israelites, Samaritans
- Region: West Bank

Site notes
- Archaeologists: Manasseh Hill Country Survey
- Condition: In ruins

Khirbet Tana et-Tahta (or simply Khirbet Tana) is a village and archeological site located in the West Bank. It lies east of Beit Furik, and is home to approximately 250 villagers. It has been subject to being within an Israeli-declared military "firing zone" since the 1970s.

== History ==
=== Population ===
Khirbet Tana has been owned by Palestinians since the Jordanian and Turkish rule of the area. About 250 people live in Khirbet Tana today– approximately forty families. According to a report by the United Nations, villagers are shepherds that rely on agriculture for their livelihood and have lived in the area for decades. Many villagers have been forced to move underground into caves to prevent the destruction of their homes.

=== Occupation ===
A few weeks after the Israeli army took control of the West Bank in 1967, Khirbet Tana was "repurposed" for Israeli training, despite the Palestinian shepards who had been tending to and living on the land for generations.

In July 2005, the Israeli Civil Administration demolished nearly all village buildings on the grounds of "construction without permit in a firing zone," despite the fact that the firing zone had been inactive for at least 15 years. The buildings were rebuilt by villagers, who then petitioned the High Court of Justice to prepare a plan for the village and not demolish their homes again.

In 2011, Israeli authorities demolished "all the structures in the Palestinian village Khirbet Tana" including the community's original school.

On 4 March 2016, Israel demolished 41 buildings in Khirbet Tana, including an elementary school that had been funded by Oxfam and built by international volunteers. Later that month, on 23 March 2016, an additional 53 structures were destroyed, including animal shelters, latrine units, traditional ovens, and a water reservoir. Some of these structures predated the Israeli occupation in 1967, and others had recently been constructed by donor-funded humanitarian assistance.

In June 2021, Israeli settlers set fire to pastureland used by Palestinian villagers in Khirbet Tana.

== Biblical identification ==
Khirbet Tana et-Tahta is identified with Taanath Shiloh (Hebrew: תַּאֲנַת שִׁלֹה), a place mentioned in the Hebrew Bible as one of the landmarks on the boundary of Tribe of Ephraim. Taanath Shiloh was previously identified with the nearby site of Khirbet Tana et-Foqa, but based on archeological evidence, Tana et-Tahta seems like the more probable candidate.

Yanun, believed by some archeologists to be the location of biblical Janohah, lies nearby.

== Archeology ==
The site was surveyed by the Manasseh Hill Country Survey and no orderly excavation was conducted. The survey documented the remains of a multi-period settlement that was proposed to be identified with the biblical town of Taanath Shiloh and with Thena, a city mentioned in several sources from the Roman and Byzantine periods.

In his Onomasticon, Eusebius mentions a place called Thena on the road to the Jordan river, around 10 milestones east of Neapolis. Ptolemy describes Thena, as a town in Samaria.

The remains of the Roman-Byzantine city covered an area of over 100 dunams across the summit and also on the slope north of it. The ethnic identity of its residents remains unclear; it is believed that they were Samaritans or that it had a mixed population of Samaritans and other ethnicities.

Significant remains at the site include a public structure (maybe a Samaritan synagogue), several underground systems, burial caves and a water supply system which has its origins in the Ein al-Foqa spring. The remains of a Roman road have been also discovered near Khirbet Tana et-Tahta; the location of several Iron Age sites nearby suggests that the road dates back to biblical times.
