= Salim, Nablus =

Salim
- Municipality type D (Village council)

Arabic transcription(s)
  - Arabic: سالم
  - Latin: Salem (official)
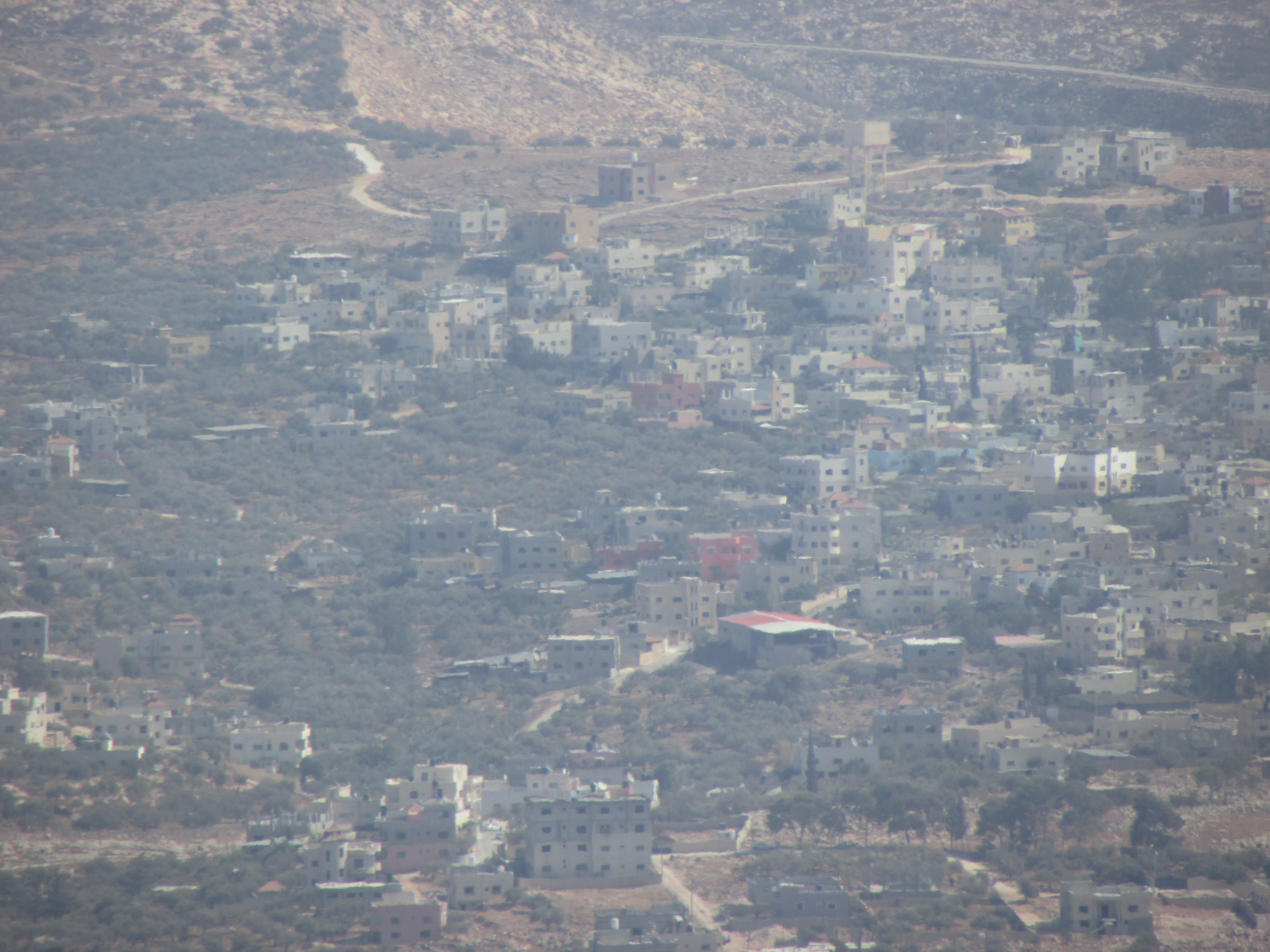
- Salim, from Mount Ebal

- Location of Salim within Palestine
- Coordinates: 32°12′34″N 35°19′54″E
- Palestine grid: 181/179
- State: State of Palestine
- Governorate: Nablus

Government
  - Type: Village council

Area
  - Total: 10.3 km^{2} (4.0 sq mi)

Population (2017)
  - Total: 6,266
  - Density: 608/km^{2} (1,580/sq mi)
- Name meaning: Salem

Salim (Arabic: سالم) is a Palestinian town in the northern West Bank, located six kilometers east of Nablus and is a part of the Nablus Governorate. According to the Palestinian Central Bureau of Statistics (PCBS), Salim had a population of 6,266 inhabitants in 2017.

== Location ==
Salim is located 6.63 kilometers (4.12 mi) east of Nablus. It is bordered by Beit Dajan to the east, Deir al Hatab to the north and west, Beit Dajan and Beit Furik to the south.

== History ==
The village is ancient with foundations of houses. The village has been populated in Early Bronze I, Iron Age II, Hellenistic, Roman, Byzantine, Umayyad and Crusader/Ayyubid eras. In 1882, traces of ruins, cisterns, a ruined tank, and a cemetery of rock-cut tombs were noted.

Salim dates back to the Middle Bronze Age. It was near the ancient Canaanite and later Israelite town of Shechem.

Salem was large and ancient Samaritan village. According to Samaritan tradition, Salim was founded by the biblical figure of Jared son of Mahalalel, and this is where 4th-century High Priest Baba Rabba built his sixth synagogue. Samaritan texts refer to the place as "Shalem Rabbta", and mention that Samaritan High Priests live there.

Salim is also mentioned in the Samaritan Continuatio of the Samaritan Chronicle of Abu l-Fath. The text mentions an event during the Fourth Fitna (811–819) when a rebel named Abu 'Uf, from the Judham tribe, reached Salem and was killed there during battles between Muslim factions.

=== Ottoman era ===
In 1517, Salim was incorporated into the Ottoman Empire with the rest of Palestine. In 1596, it appeared in Ottoman tax registers as being in the Nahiya of Jabal Qubal of the Liwa of Nablus. It had a population of 42 households, all Muslim. The villagers paid a fixed tax-rate of 33,3% on agricultural products, including wheat, barley, summer crops, olives, and goats or beehives, and for a press for olives or grapes; a total of 10,432 akçe.

In 1838, Robinson noted Salim as a village in the same area as the villages Azmut and Deir al-Hatab, all were part of the El-Beitawy district, east of Nablus.

In May, 1870, Guérin came to the village, after walking through fields of olives, figs and almond trees. He found a village with a maximum of 200 people, in ancient houses. A dozen cisterns in the village were dry, so the women had to fetch water from a stream, called Ain Salim, about 1 kilometre north-northwest of the village.

In 1882, the PEF's Survey of Western Palestine described Salim as a small village, but evidently ancient, surrounded by olive-trees and with two springs to the north.

=== British Mandate era ===
In the 1922 census of Palestine conducted by the British Mandate authorities, Salem had a population of 423, all Muslims, while in the 1931 census, Salim, including El Hamra, had 100 occupied houses and a population of 490, again all Muslim.

In the 1945 statistics Salim had a population of 660, all Muslims, with 10,293 dunams of land, according to an official land and population survey. Of this, 229 dunams were plantations and irrigable land, 5,158 used for cereals, while 24 dunams were built-up land.

=== Jordanian era ===
During the 1948 war the area was held by units from the Iraqi Army. In the wake of the 1948 Arab–Israeli War Salim came under Jordanian rule.

The Jordanian census of 1961 found 888 inhabitants.

=== Post-1967 ===
Since the Six-Day War in 1967, Salim has been under Israeli occupation.

After the 1995 accords 27% of the village land is defined to be Area B land, while the remaining 73% is in Area C.

== See also ==
- Havat Skali
- Ma'ale Iron, including village Salim, northeast of Umm al-Fahm

== Bibliography ==
- Barron, J.B., ed. (1923). Palestine: Report and General Abstracts of the Census of 1922. Government of Palestine.
- Conder, C.R.; Kitchener, H.H. (1882). The Survey of Western Palestine: Memoirs of the Topography, Orography, Hydrography, and Archaeology. Vol. 2. London: Committee of the Palestine Exploration Fund.
- Dauphin, C. (1998). La Palestine byzantine, Peuplement et Populations. BAR International Series 726 (in French). Vol. III : Catalogue. Oxford: Archeopress. ISBN 0-860549-05-4.
- Finkelstein, I.; Lederman, Zvi, eds. (1997). Highlands of many cultures. Tel Aviv: Institute of Archaeology of Tel Aviv University Publications Section. ISBN 965-440-007-3.
- Government of Jordan, Department of Statistics (1964). First Census of Population and Housing. Volume I: Final Tables; General Characteristics of the Population (PDF).
- Government of Palestine, Department of Statistics (1945). Village Statistics, April, 1945.
- Guérin, V. (1874). Description Géographique Historique et Archéologique de la Palestine (in French). Vol. 2: Samarie, pt. 1. Paris: L'Imprimerie Nationale.
- Hadawi, S. (1970). Village Statistics of 1945: A Classification of Land and Area ownership in Palestine. Palestine Liberation Organization Research Centre.
- Hütteroth, W.-D.; Abdulfattah, K. (1977). Historical Geography of Palestine, Transjordan and Southern Syria in the Late 16th Century. Erlanger Geographische Arbeiten, Sonderband 5. Erlangen, Germany: Vorstand der Fränkischen Geographischen Gesellschaft. ISBN 3-920405-41-2.
- Mills, E., ed. (1932). Census of Palestine 1931. Population of Villages, Towns and Administrative Areas. Jerusalem: Government of Palestine.
- Palmer, E.H. (1881). The Survey of Western Palestine: Arabic and English Name Lists Collected During the Survey by Lieutenants Conder and Kitchener, R. E. Transliterated and Explained by E.H. Palmer. Committee of the Palestine Exploration Fund.
- Robinson, E.; Smith, E. (1841). Biblical Researches in Palestine, Mount Sinai and Arabia Petraea: A Journal of Travels in the year 1838. Vol. 3. Boston: Crocker & Brewster.
