= Deir al-Hatab =

- Municipality type D (Village council)

Arabic transcription(s)
  - Arabic: دير الحطب
  - Latin: Dayr al-Hatab (official)
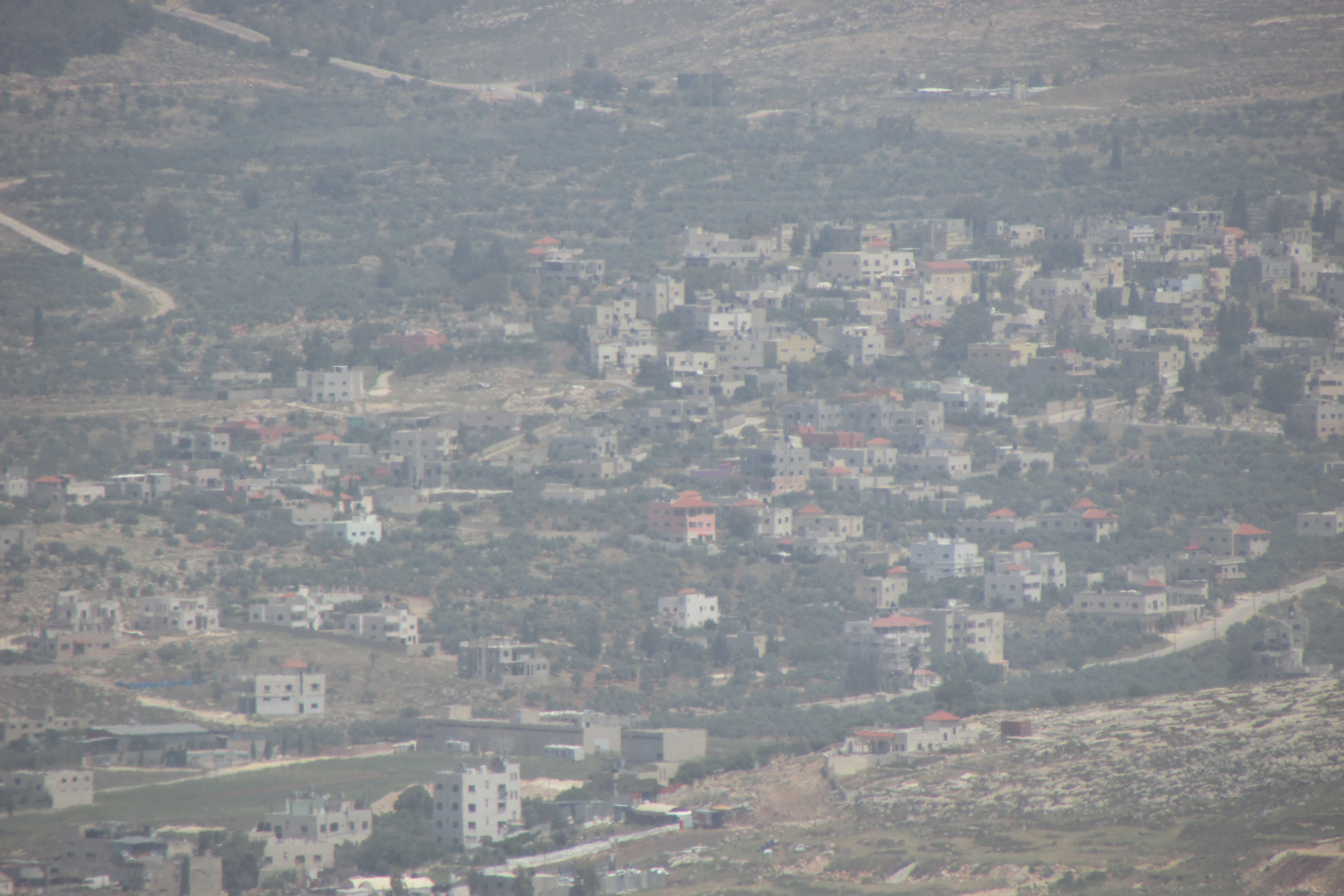
- Deir al-Hatab from the south west

- Location of Deir al-Hatab within Palestine Location of Deir al-Hatab within the West Bank
- Coordinates: 32°13′02″N 35°19′15″E
- Palestine grid: 180/180
- State: State of Palestine
- Governorate: Nablus

Government
  - Type: Village council
  - Head of Municipality: Hussein Abd al-Kareem

Area
  - Total: 5.5 km^{2} (2.1 sq mi)

Population (2017)
  - Total: 2,838
  - Density: 520/km^{2} (1,300/sq mi)
- Name meaning: "The convent of timber"

Deir al-Hatab (Arabic: دير الحطب) is a Palestinian village in the Nablus Governorate in the northern West Bank, located east of Nablus, near the neighbouring villages of Salem and Azmout. The village land extends over 12,000 dunams, of which 330 are built-up.

The Israeli settlement of Elon Moreh was illegally established within Deir al-Hatab's jurisdiction, taking up nearly 2,000 dunams of the village's land.

In June, 2016, Deir al-Hatab and other towns and villages in the area had to go without running water for weeks, as the Israeli Mekorot reduced the amount of water it sold to the Palestinians.

== Location ==
Deir al Hatab is located 5.7 kilometers (3.5 mi) east of Nablus. It is bordered by Beit Dajan to the east, Al ‘Aqrabaniya and ‘Azmut to the north, ‘Azmut and Nablus to the west, and Salim to the south.

== History ==
There was a human habitation here during the Iron Age II time.

Ceramics from the Byzantine era have been found here. Much pottery from the Umayyad era have been found around the maqam of Sheikh Ahmed.

=== Ottoman era ===
In 1838, in the Ottoman era, Edward Robinson noted Deir al-Hatab as a village in the same area as the villages Azmut and Salim, all Muslim villages that were part of the El-Beitawy district, east of Nablus.

When Victor Guérin visited in 1870, he found that Deir al-Hatab had at most 100 inhabitants. He further noted that the many dilapidated houses showed that the village had formerly been more important. The ancient cisterns dug into the rock were dry, so the women fetched water at A'ïn Salem.

In 1882, the PEF's Survey of Western Palestine described it as a "small village, with olives and a well to the south, standing on a hill slope."

=== British Mandate era ===
In the 1922 census of Palestine, conducted by the British Mandate authorities, Deir al-Hatab had a population of 234, all Muslims, increasing in the 1931 census to 277, still all Muslim, in total of 51 houses.

In the 1945 statistics, Deir el Hatab had a population of 370, all Muslims, with 11,532 dunams of land, according to an official land and population survey. Of this, 4 dunams were for citrus and bananas, 679 dunams were plantations and irrigable land, 5,172 used for cereals, while 33 dunams were built-up (urban) land.

=== Jordanian era ===
In the wake of the 1948 Arab–Israeli War, and after the 1949 Armistice Agreements, Deir al-Hatab came under Jordanian rule.

The Jordanian census of 1961 found 481 inhabitants.

=== Post-1967 ===
Since the Six-Day War in 1967, Deir al-Hatab has been under Israeli occupation. The population of Deir el Hatab in the 1967 census conducted by Israel was 543, of whom 4 originated from Israeli territory. In 1987, 1,120 people were living in Deir al-Hatab.

After the 1995 accords, 42% of village land was classified as Area B, while the remaining 58% was classified as Area C.

Since the Israeli occupation, the Israelis have confiscated 659 dunams of the village's land for the Israeli settlement of Elon Moreh.

According to the Palestinian Central Bureau of Statistics, Deir al-Hatab had a population of over 2,213 inhabitants in 2007 and 2,838 in 2017. Around 33% of households in the village have 1-5 members, 51% have 6-10 members and 17% have over 10 members. About 10% of the population over ten years of age is illiterate, women making up 78% of this statistic. In addition, 43% of the student population are females.

Agriculture forms 24% of Deir al-Hatab's economy while small business, work in the government and construction form the remainder. Over half of the population is of working age (15-64) and women made-up half of the labor force in 1999. Deir al-Hatab's village council claims unemployment has dramatically increased from 30% in 1999 to 90% in 2001. Because Elon Moreh and its outposts overlooks and is in proximity to half of the land, Palestinian farmers have in the last decade been allowed only a few days each year to tend their fields, after coordinating with the Israel Defense Forces.

From 2002 to 2007 the IDF banned the villagers from working their land, and settlers began to plant new olive trees and grapevines on private lots. A 'disruptive use' injunction was issued in January 2007 by Major General Yair Naveh, allowing Palestinian authorities to remove settlers who had engaged in illegal cultivation of local lands in the preceding 3 years. The ordinance has not deterred settler appropriation of Deir al-Hatab's land, according to Amira Hass, and injunctions are often not implemented.

In 2007, Israeli settlers from Elon Moreh put a plastic swimming pool by the spring which supplies Deir al-Hatab with 40% of its drinking water. They diverted the water from the spring to their pool. The contaminated waste water from this swimming pool then reentered into the drinking water of Deir al-Hatab.

In November, 2021, the child Mohammad Da’das (age given variously as 13 or 15 years old), was shot in the abdomen and killed by an Israeli soldier in Deir al-Hatab. Palestinian PM Mohammad Shtayyeh condemned the killing as "state terrorism".

== Bibliography ==
- Barron, J.B., ed. (1923). Palestine: Report and General Abstracts of the Census of 1922. Government of Palestine.
- Bull, Robert J.; Edward F. Campbell (1968). "The Sixth Campaign at Balâṭah (Shechem)". Bulletin of the American Schools of Oriental Research. 190 (190): 2–41. doi:10.2307/1356191. JSTOR 1356191. S2CID 222441522.
- Conder, C.R.; Kitchener, H.H. (1882). The Survey of Western Palestine: Memoirs of the Topography, Orography, Hydrography, and Archaeology. Vol. 2. London: Committee of the Palestine Exploration Fund.
- Dauphin, C. (1998). La Palestine byzantine, Peuplement et Populations. BAR International Series 726 (in French). Vol. III : Catalogue. Oxford: Archeopress. ISBN 0-86054-905-4.
- Government of Jordan, Department of Statistics (1964). First Census of Population and Housing. Volume I: Final Tables; General Characteristics of the Population (PDF).
- Government of Palestine, Department of Statistics (1945). Village Statistics, April, 1945.
- Guérin, V. (1874). Description Géographique Historique et Archéologique de la Palestine (in French). Vol. 2: Samarie, pt. 1. Paris: L'Imprimerie Nationale.
- Hadawi, S. (1970). Village Statistics of 1945: A Classification of Land and Area ownership in Palestine. Palestine Liberation Organization Research Center.
- Jaroš, K.; Deckert B. (1977). Studien zur Sichem Ära (PDF). University of Zurich. pp. 1–83. ISBN 3-7278-0180-8.
- Mills, E., ed. (1932). Census of Palestine 1931. Population of Villages, Towns and Administrative Areas. Jerusalem: Government of Palestine.
- Palmer, E.H. (1881). The Survey of Western Palestine: Arabic and English Name Lists Collected During the Survey by Lieutenants Conder and Kitchener, R. E. Transliterated and Explained by E.H. Palmer. Committee of the Palestine Exploration Fund.
- Robinson, E.; Smith, E. (1841). Biblical Researches in Palestine, Mount Sinai and Arabia Petraea: A Journal of Travels in the year 1838. Vol. 3. Boston: Crocker & Brewster.
