= Havat Skali =

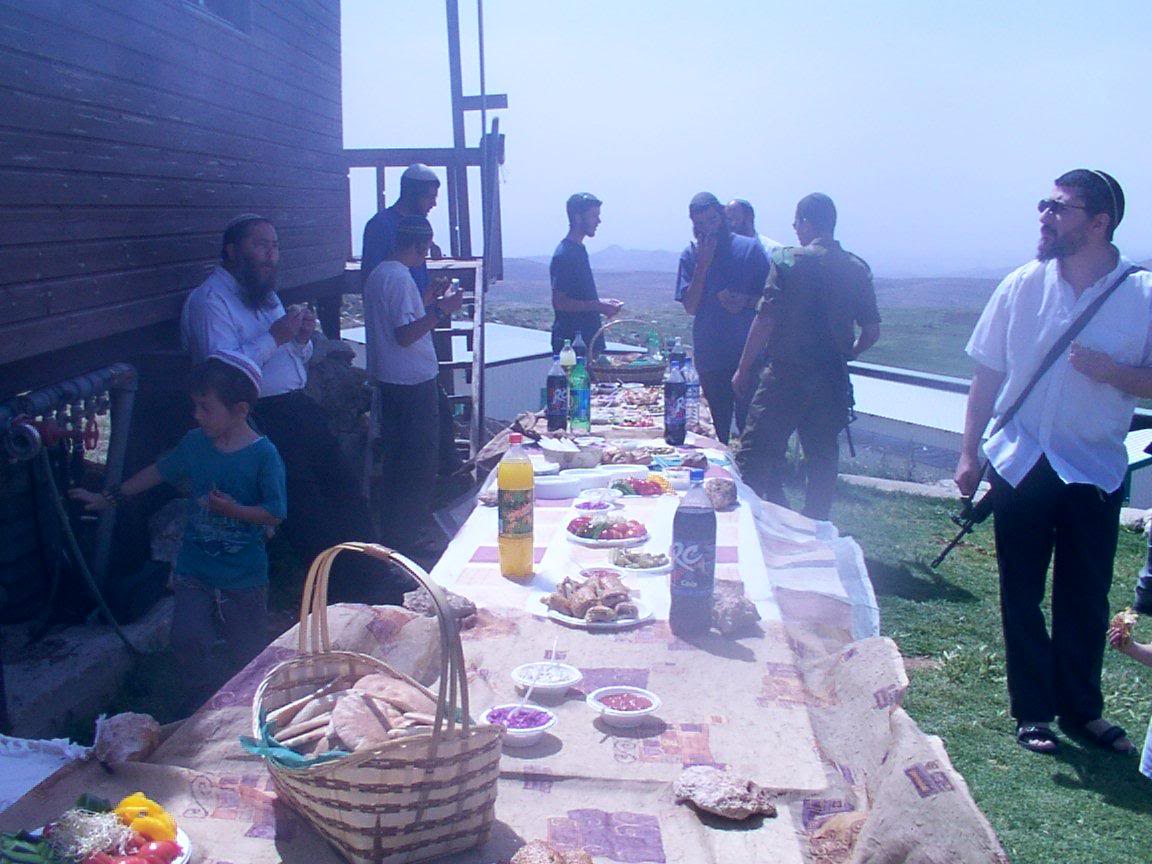
- Men with guns, Skali Farm

- Location within the Northern West Bank
- Coordinates: 32.213893°N 35.370690°E
- Country: Palestine
- District: Judea and Samaria Area
- Council: Shomron
- Region: West Bank
- Founded: 1999
- Founder: Yitzhak Skali

Havat Skali (Hebrew: חוות סקאלי, lit. 'Skali Farm'), also known as Point 792, is an Israeli outpost in the West Bank. Located around four kilometres south-east of Elon Moreh, it falls under the jurisdiction of the Shomron Regional Council.

The international community considers Israeli settlements in the West Bank illegal under international law, whereas Israeli outposts, like Havat Skali, are considered illegal both under international law as well as under Israeli law.

== History ==
The outpost was established by Yitzhak Skali in 1999, and is home to around 20 people. It was slated to be evacuated in mid-2006, pending a government decision to remove dozens of such outposts.

== See also ==
- At Skali's Farm, they blame the media for militant image, Nadav Shragai, June 5, 2006, Haaretz
