= Azmut =

’Azmut
- Municipality type C

Arabic transcription(s)
  - Arabic: عزموط
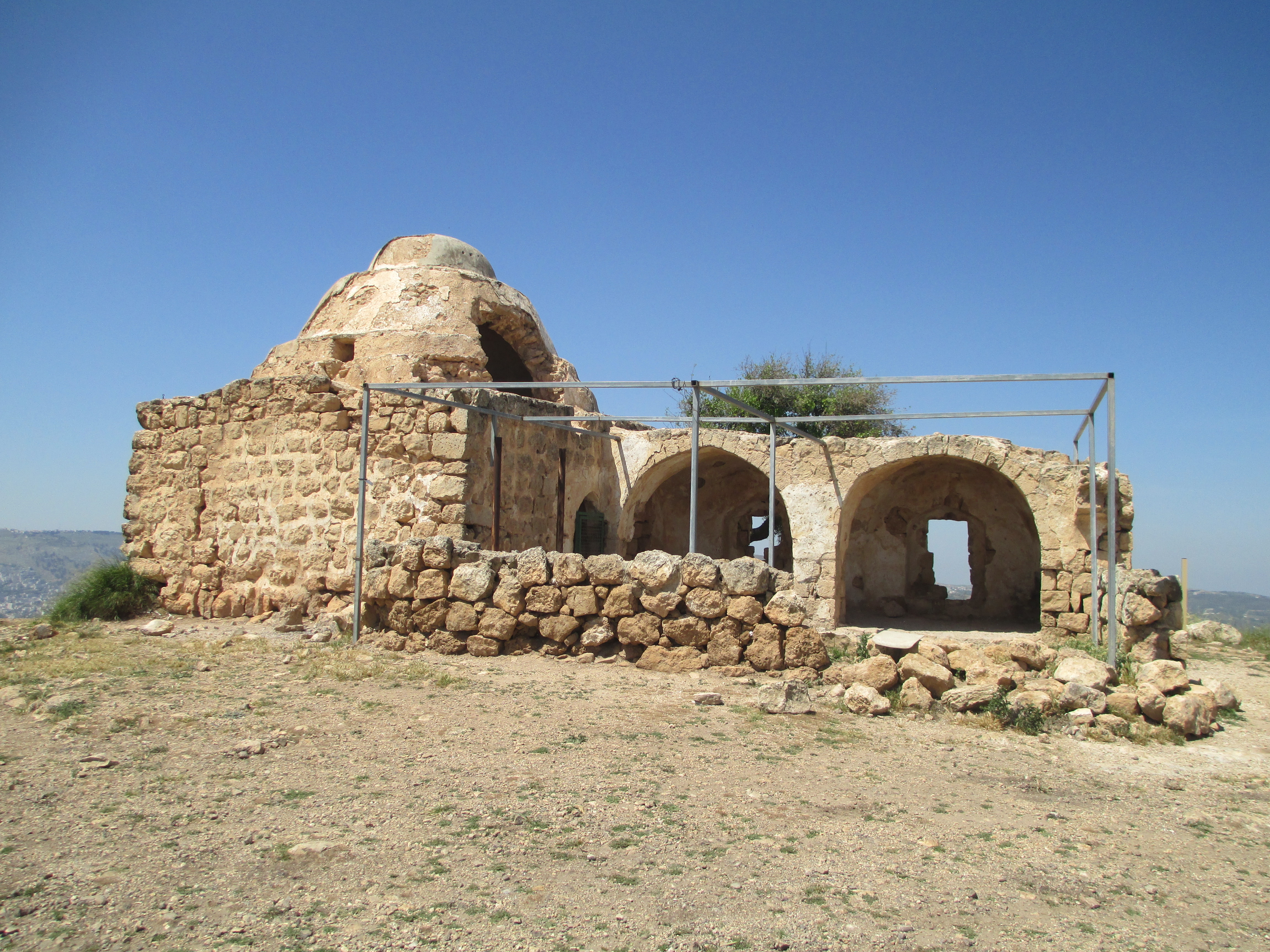
- Maqam of Sheikh Bilal, confiscated by Israel for the Israel settlement of Elon Moreh

- Location of ’Azmut within Palestine Location of ’Azmut within the West Bank
- Coordinates: 32°13′23″N 35°18′35″E
- Palestine grid: 179/181
- State: State of Palestine
- Governorate: Nablus

Government
  - Type: Municipality

Population (2017)
  - Total: 3,440
- Name meaning: Azmut, from personal name

’Azmut (Arabic: عزموط) is a Palestinian village in the Nablus Governorate in the eastern West Bank, located five kilometers northeast of Nablus. According to the Palestinian Central Bureau of Statistics (PCBS), the village had a population of 3,440 inhabitants in 2017.

== Location ==
‘Azmut is located 4.6 kilometers (2.9 mi) east of Nablus. It is bordered by Deir al Hatab and Al Aqrabaniya to the east, Al Bahdan to the north, ‘Asira ash Shamaliya and Nablus to the west, and Deir al Hatab to the south.

== History ==
One pottery sherd has been found from each of the Hellenistic and early Roman eras. Much more pottery has been found from the late Roman and Byzantine eras.

=== Ottoman era ===
Incorporated into the Ottoman Empire in 1517 with the rest of Palestine, in 1596 the village appeared in Ottoman tax registers as being in the nahiya of Jabal Qubal in the liwa of Nablus. It had a population of 18 households and 2 bachelors, all Muslim. They paid a fixed tax-rate of 33.3 % on agricultural products, including wheat, barley, summer crops, olive trees, goats and beehives, in addition to occasional revenues and a press for olive oil or syrup - a total of 4,000 akçe.

In 1838, Edward Robinson noted Azmut as a village in the same area as Salim and Deir al-Hatab. All were Muslim villages, part of the El-Beitawy district, east of Nablus.

In 1870, Victor Guérin visited, after visiting Deir al-Hatab. About Azmut, he noted that it was: "a small village a little less in ruin the previous one. It must have succeeded also to an ancient locality, as is proved by a number of cisterns cut out from the rock, most of them without water, but one of which, among others, still serves the needs of the inhabitants. Two oualys are devoted to two different sheikhs."

In 1882, the PEF's Survey of Western Palestine described Azmut as a "small village, standing on the slope of the hill, with cliffs on the west."

=== British Mandate era ===
In the 1922 census of Palestine conducted by the British Mandate authorities, Azmut had a population of 283 Muslims, increasing at the time of the 1931 census to 307, still all Muslim, in 70 houses.

In the 1945 statistics, Azmut had a population of 410, all Muslims, with 10,748 dunams of land, according to an official land and population survey. Of this, 343 dunams were plantations and irrigable land, 3,259 were used for cereals, while 23 dunams were built-up land.

=== Jordanian era ===
In the wake of the 1948 Arab–Israeli War, and after the 1949 Armistice Agreements, Azmut came under Jordanian rule.

The Jordanian census of 1961 found 615 inhabitants.

=== 1967, aftermath ===
Since the Six-Day War in 1967, Azmut has been under Israeli occupation along with the rest of the Palestinian territories.

After the 1995 accords, 59% of village land is defined as Area B, the remaining 41% is defined as Area C. The Israelis have confiscated hundreds of dunams of land from Azmut, primarily to construct military bases, in addition to 639 dunums of Azmuts land which went to construct the Israeli settlement of Elon Moreh.

== Bibliography ==
- Barron, J.B., ed. (1923). Palestine: Report and General Abstracts of the Census of 1922. Government of Palestine.
- Bull, Robert J.; Edward F. Campbell (1968). "The Sixth Campaign at Balâṭah (Shechem)". Bulletin of the American Schools of Oriental Research. 190 (190): 2–41. doi:10.2307/1356191. JSTOR 1356191. S2CID 222441522.
- Conder, C.R.; Kitchener, H.H. (1882). The Survey of Western Palestine: Memoirs of the Topography, Orography, Hydrography, and Archaeology. Vol. 2. London: Committee of the Palestine Exploration Fund.
- Dauphin, C. (1998). La Palestine byzantine, Peuplement et Populations. BAR International Series 726 (in French). Vol. III : Catalogue. Oxford: Archeopress. ISBN 0-860549-05-4.
- Government of Jordan, Department of Statistics (1964). First Census of Population and Housing. Volume I: Final Tables; General Characteristics of the Population (PDF).
- Government of Palestine, Department of Statistics (1945). Village Statistics, April, 1945.
- Guérin, V. (1874). Description Géographique Historique et Archéologique de la Palestine (in French). Vol. 2: Samarie, pt. 1. Paris: L'Imprimerie Nationale.
- Hadawi, S. (1970). Village Statistics of 1945: A Classification of Land and Area ownership in Palestine. Palestine Liberation Organization Research Center.
- Hütteroth, W.-D.; Abdulfattah, K. (1977). Historical Geography of Palestine, Transjordan and Southern Syria in the Late 16th Century. Erlanger Geographische Arbeiten, Sonderband 5. Erlangen, Germany: Vorstand der Fränkischen Geographischen Gesellschaft. ISBN 3-920405-41-2.
- Mills, E., ed. (1932). Census of Palestine 1931. Population of Villages, Towns and Administrative Areas. Jerusalem: Government of Palestine.
- Palmer, E.H. (1881). The Survey of Western Palestine: Arabic and English Name Lists Collected During the Survey by Lieutenants Conder and Kitchener, R. E. Transliterated and Explained by E.H. Palmer. Committee of the Palestine Exploration Fund.
- Robinson, E.; Smith, E. (1841). Biblical Researches in Palestine, Mount Sinai and Arabia Petraea: A Journal of Travels in the year 1838. Vol. 3. Boston: Crocker & Brewster.
- Saulcy, L.F. de (1854). Narrative of a journey round the Dead Sea, and in the Bible lands, in 1850 and 1851. Vol. 1, new edition. London: R. Bentley. (Saulcy, 1854, vol 1, p. 99)
