= Israeli firing zones in the West Bank =

Israeli-occupied areas since 1967

OCHA oPt map showing firing zones in orange, 2012. A notable concentration can be seen in the Jordan Valley, where 96% of the area has been declared by Israel as state land or as a firing zone.

Israeli firing zones in the West Bank are extensive areas of Area C in the occupied West Bank declared off-limits to civilian presence for the ostensible purpose of military training. They are considered to be part of the wider issue of Israeli land expropriation in the West Bank, alongside the declarations of State Land in the West Bank.

Since 1967, Israel has designated roughly 18–20% of the West Bank (nearly 30% of Area C) as firing zones. In these zones, any civilian presence or construction without special permission is forbidden by military order. Despite the restrictions, dozens of longstanding Palestinian communities—over 5,000 people in 38 villages as of recent counts—live inside these areas.

Israeli firing zones in the West Bank continue to be a contentious issue, with implications for military policy, settlement expansion, and human rights. While Israel argues these areas are necessary for security, international bodies widely view them as mechanisms of land control that contribute to displacement and restrict Palestinian development. According to Amnesty International the "Israeli army routinely demolishes Palestinian homes and structures in these "firing zones"; by contrast, the Israel authorities have changed the status of some "of these "firing zones" to allow for the expansion of Israeli settlements located partially or completely in them." The eviction of Palestinians in these areas has been criticized by the United Nations, human rights organizations like B'Tselem, Bimkom and Human Rights Watch, and the European Union.

== History ==
In 1945, the British government in Mandatory Palestine enacted the Defence Emergency Regulations, and Regulation 125—Area Closures of these regulations enabled military officers to declare certain areas to be 'closed military zones'. After its establishment May 1948, Israel adopted these regulations to impose an official state of emergency on the Palestinians inside of its newly established borders.

After the 1967 Six-Day War and Israel's occupation of the West Bank, the Israeli military began designating large tracts of land as closed military areas. Between August 1967 and 1975, about 150,000 hectares (over 25% of the West Bank) were classified as military zones. According to the Encyclopedia of the Israeli-Palestinian Conflict, "these zones need not be of military significance; at times, Israeli officials abort peaceful demonstrations or restrict journalistic access to an area by temporarily designating a site—a building, a city, a region, a refugee camp, the entire Gaza Strip, even occasionally the whole West Bank—a closed military area."

By the end of 1967, nearly 68,500 hectares were restricted. Areas such as the Jordan Valley and the Latrun region were among the first to be closed.

In a 1979 meeting, then-Agriculture Minister Ariel Sharon revealed that many firing zones were designated with the explicit intent of reserving land for future Israeli settlements. Sharon stated that:

As the person who initiated the military fire zones in 1967, they were all intended for one purpose: to provide an opportunity for Jewish settlement in the area. As soon as the Six-Day War ended, I was still sitting with my division in Sinai. I was in Sinai when I drew up these zones. The firing zones were created for one purpose: land reserves for settlements.

In 2012, 900 dunams from a firing zone were given to Sha'arei Tikva, an Israeli settlement founded in 1983.

In 2014 it was reported that 35,000 dunums of "firing zone" land was being surveyed for the building of Israeli settlements.

In 2015, Israel officially removed the firing zone designation from part of Firing Zone 912 to allow the expansion of Ma'ale Adumim settlement.

== List ==
Below is a breakdown of notable Israeli firing zones in the West Bank:

Firing Zone	Geographic Area	Date of Designation	Estimated Palestinian Population at Designation	Current Population
Firing Zone 901	Northern Jordan Valley	1968	Few dozen families	~70 people in Khirbet Yarza
Firing Zone 902	Northern Jordan Valley	1970s	Small herding groups	Mostly seasonal presence
Firing Zone 903	Um Zukka (Jordan Valley)	1972	Few hundred	Few dozen, area incorporated into Israeli settlement farmlands
Firing Zone 904A	Eastern Nablus Hills	1970s	~200 people in Khirbet Tana et-Tahta	~250 residents (many demolitions)
Firing Zone 912	Judean Desert	1970s	Hundreds of Jahalin Bedouin	Under 200 (many evictions)
Firing Zone 918	South Hebron Hills	Late 1970s	700–1,000 residents in Masafer Yatta	~1,100-1,300 today under eviction threats

The Applied Research Institute–Jerusalem database of firing zones is shown below:

Code Name	Palestinian Localities	Israeli Settlements in Master Plan	Area (dunums)	Location
Firing Zone 203	11	2	32,591	Ramallah Governorate
Firing Zone 208	8	0	9,725	Ramallah Governorate
Firing Zone 309	3	0	8,263	Hebron Governorate
Firing Zone 900	4	1	73,077	Jordan Valley
Firing Zone 901	3	0	49,229	Tubas Governorate
Firing Zone 902	2	1	10,653	Jordan Valley
Firing Zone 903	3	4	80,309	Jordan Valley
Firing Zone 904 a	5	4	42,497	Nablus Governorate & Jordan Valley
Firing Zone 904	6	4	60,781	Nablus Governorate & Jordan Valley
Firing Zone 906	7	7	88,256	Ramallah Governorate & Jordan Valley
Firing Zone 911	2	1	6,819	Jordan Valley
Firing Zone 911 a	2	0	4,632	Jordan Valley
Firing Zone 918	2	3	32,712	Hebron Governorate
Firing Zone 929	5	1	58,711	Ramallah Governorate
Firing Zone 929 a	1	0	170	Hebron Governorate
Firing Zone 930	1	1	168	Hebron Governorate
Firing Zone 934	7	1	14,745	Ramallah Governorate
Firing Zone 959	1	0	76	Hebron Governorate
Firing Zone aa	10	13	409,294	Jerusalem Governorate & Jordan Valley
Firing Zone aaa	7	2	15,477	Ramallah Governorate
Total	90	45	998,185	
