= Kehilla Community Synagogue =

Unaffiliated Jewish synagogue in Oakland, California, United States

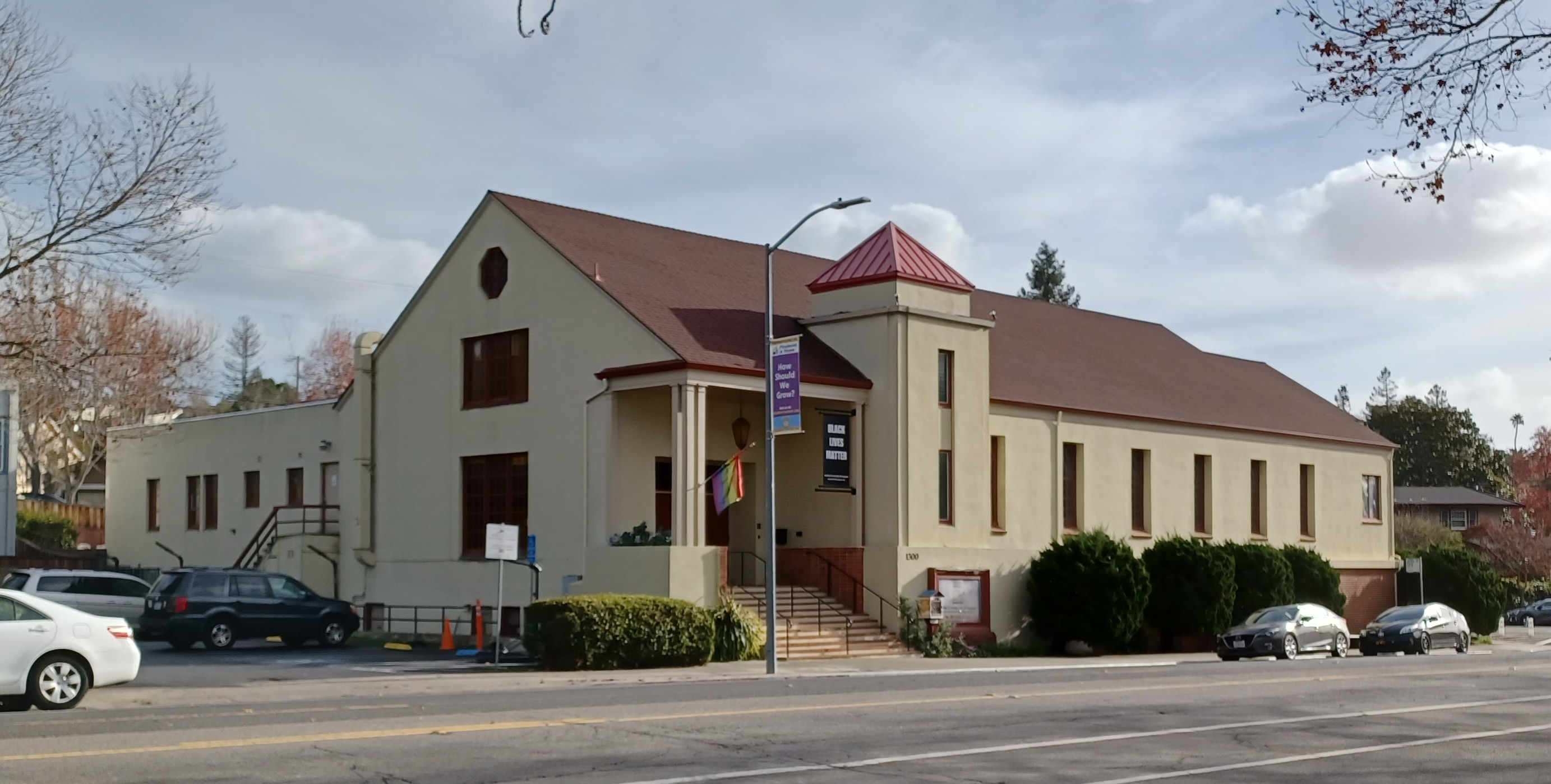
- The synagogue

- Location in San Francisco Bay Area

Religion
- Affiliation: Judaism
- Rite: Unaffiliated
- Ecclesiastical or organisational status: Synagogue
- Status: Active

Location
- Location: 1300 Grand Avenue, Piedmont, Oakland, San Francisco Bay Area, California 94610
- Country: United States
- Coordinates: 37°49′13″N 122°14′39″W

Architecture
- Established: 1984 (as a congregation)

Website
- kehillasynagogue.org

Kehilla Community Synagogue is an unaffiliated Jewish congregation and synagogue, located in the suburb of Piedmont, Oakland, in the San Francisco Bay Area of California, in the United States.

Founded in 1984 by "people who wanted a synagogue that would be a spiritual home for politically progressive people who felt no connection with traditional synagogues", the congregation sees its "spiritual mandate to heal and repair the world by increasing social justice, eschewing war and all forms of violence and aggression, caring for the planet, and exhibiting loving kindness to all."

The congregation is open to people of all colors, genders, and sexual orientations. They support Palestinian liberation, oppose the Israeli occupation of the West Bank, and have supported the creation of an independent Palestinian state since 1988. They are part of the Jewish Renewal movement and are affiliated with ALEPH: Alliance for Jewish Renewal.
