= Elon Moreh =

Israeli settlement in the West Bank

Elon Moreh: אֵלוֹן מוֹרֶה (Hebrew)

Hebrew transcription(s)
  - Unofficial: Elon More
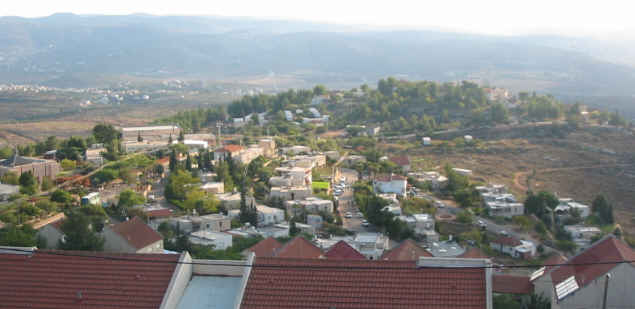
- The two older neighbourhoods, looking south
- Etymology: Named after Biblical town
- Location within the Northern West Bank
- Coordinates: 32°14′2″N 35°19′53″E
- Country: Palestine
- District: Judea and Samaria Area
- Council: Shomron
- Region: West Bank
- Affiliation: Amana
- Founded: 1980
- Population (2024): 2,169

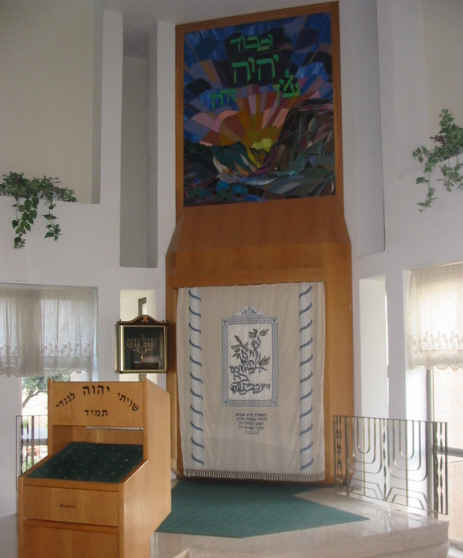
Ark in Rahamei Tirtzah synagogue

Elon Moreh (Hebrew: אֵלוֹן מוֹרֶה) is an Orthodox Jewish Israeli settlement in the West Bank. Located northeast of the Palestinian city of Nablus, on the slopes of the Mount Kabir ridge, it falls under the jurisdiction of Shomron Regional Council. In 2024, it had a population of 2,169.

Elon Moreh is located on land confiscated from two Palestinian villages, Azmut and Deir al-Hatab.

The international community considers Israeli settlements in the West Bank illegal under international law, but the Israeli government disputes this.

== Name and biblical references ==
The name of the village comes from a passage in the Torah relating to the first location where Abraham settled after crossing the Jordan River.

In the Bible, Elon Moreh is where God told Abraham, "To your descendants will I give this land" (Genesis 12:7). Jacob, the son of Isaac and grandson of Abraham, purchased land near Elon Moreh and Shechem (Genesis 33:19).

== History ==
The Elon Moreh settlement was first erected on a site adjacent to Rujeib and then, following an appeal and a court decision, was transferred in 1979 to nearby land seized by the IDF from two Palestinian villages, Azmut and Deir al-Hatab. Further swathes of land were subsequently seized from Salim. The official municipal boundaries extend around 1,844 dunams of land. According to ARIJ, the expropriations of the two villages originally were as follows

- 659 dunams from Deir al-Hatab,
- 639 dunums from Azmut.

A subsequent confiscation, amounting to 23 hectares took place with the seizure not only of further Azmut and Deit al-Hatab land, but also parcels of land belonging to the village of Salim in 1995 in order to construct Route 557, paving Elon Moreh and linking it to the nearby (3.9 km) village of Itamar. The ostensible purpose of the road was to enable the settlers to avoid passing through Salim. The road is off limits for Palestinian vehicles, and local Palestinians themselves are not allowed to cross it on foot. One side effect of this measure was to deny local West Bankers access to 70% of their remaining land.

The effective extent of Palestinian land under Elon Moreh's control is far larger. According to research undertaken by OCHA, Elon Moreh exercises an authority that imposes severe restrictions on Palestinians over 8 times more adjacent territory than the official municipal boundaries show, approximately 15,500 dunums. Official Israeli statistics themselves document that 63% of the area involved consists of privately owned by Palestinians from the three affected villages, whose combined population amounts to (2017) 11,500.

The method of making Declarations of State Land in the West Bank was subsequently used to create many other West Bank settlements. In this, too, Elon Moreh was a precedent-setting case—a positive one in the eyes of some Israelis, an illegal one according to international law.

== Arab–Israeli conflict ==
On 29 July 1985, the bodies of two young Palestinians were discovered near Elon Moreh. They had disappeared shortly after the murder of two teachers near Jenin, 21 July. The army reported that they had been preparing a bomb. Their families strongly denied this.

On 21 May 1987, 8-year-old Israeli Rami Chaba was found dead in a cave with his head smashed by a rock, outside of Elon Moreh perimeter. His parents and neighbors searched for him all night after he was last seen riding his bicycle the day before.

On 6 April 1988, Elon Moreh resident 15-year-old Tirza Porat was accidentally shot dead in the neighbouring Palestinian village of Beita by fellow Jewish settler Romam Aldubli.

On 7 October 2000, Joseph's Tomb was looted and razed by Palestinians. The next morning, the bullet-riddled body of Rabbi Hillel Lieberman of Elon Moreh, a cousin of Senator Joseph Lieberman, was found on the outskirts of Nablus, where he had gone to check damage to the tomb.

On 28 March 2002, a Palestinian gunman infiltrated the village, burst into the home of the Gavish family, and opened fire. The lone gunman managed to kill four residents, before being killed himself. The victims were Rachel Gavish (50), David Gavish (50), Avraham Gavish (20), and Yitzhak Kanner (83).

In March 2012, two Palestinians were spotted attempting to infiltrate Elon Moreh. They were arrested by the IDF when they were found to be in possession of large knives. It is believed by security forces that a stabbing attack was prevented.

On 23 July 2023, two Palestinian men stabbed a 51-year-old Israeli man who was attempting to extinguish a fire that had been started by Palestinians from the nearby village of Beit Furik, seriously injuring him.
