= Beita incident =

Incident of Israeli settler-led violence

The Beita incident was a confrontation that took place between Israeli settlers from Elon Moreh and Palestinian residents of Beita, on 6 April 1988. Three people were killed and several others wounded.

== Incident ==
The incident occurred when a group of 15 teenagers from the Israeli settlement of Elon Moreh, 10 kilometers (6.2 mi) north of Beita, had gone hiking during the Passover school holiday accompanied by a guide and two guards, Romam Aldube and Menachem Ilan. About 10 kilometres South of Elon Moreh, whilst on land belonging to Beita village, they came across a farmer, Mousa Saleh Bani Shamseh. After an exchange of words, Romam Aldube shot him dead. The group then continued into the village.

Within the village a rumour had spread that the Israelis had come to poison the village well. A crowd gathered and confronted the group. Palestinian residents said the guards provoked the incident by shooting 19-year-old, Hatem Fayez Ahmd al-Jaber who approached the Israelis. Other reports describe the mother of Mousa Saleh throwing a stone at Aldube. The crowd then charged the hikers, disarming the guards and destroyed their guns. Aldube received a serious head wound. 15-year-old Israeli Tirza Porat from Elon Moreh was killed during this incident. She was the first Israeli civilian casualty in the West Bank during the First Intifada.

Initial reports in the media stated that Tirza Porat had been killed by Palestinian stone throwers. An official statement spoke of the group falling 'into the hands of pogromists and murderers'. Prime Minister Yitzhak Shamir attended her funeral at which there were cries of "Revenge" and "Wipe Beita off the map". The following day the IDF revealed that she had been accidentally shot in the head with the M16 carbine belonging to Romam Aldubi, a Jewish 26-year-old violence-prone religious nationalist. It was also revealed that 'the young settlers, instructed by their elders, had rendered untruthful accounts.' Despite knowing from the start who was responsible the Israeli Army dynamited 15 buildings in Beita. They also killed a sixteen-year-old boy Issam Abdul Halim Mohammad Said and arrested all male adult residents, six of whom were later deported. Romam Aldubi was brought to trial in Israel, but the charges were dropped on the grounds "that what had happened [was] already punishment enough".

Chief of Staff Gen. Dan Shomron later said that Palestinian villagers protected the Israelis from further harm. Some residents helped the teenagers, including several women who hid three girls inside their homes.

A medic in a CBS News crew on site began treating the Israelis injured, some of whom were evacuated by Palestine Red Crescent Society ambulances. As well as the two fatalities several villagers suffered severe gunshot wounds. Three people were killed and several others wounded.
