= Umm al-Khair, Hebron =

Village in West Bank, Palestine

Umm al-Khair أم الخير
- Municipality type D (Village council)

Arabic transcription(s)
  - Latin: Umm al-Kheir (unofficial)
- Location of Umm al-Khair within Palestine
- Coordinates: 31°25′30″N 35°11′46″E
- Palestine grid: 167/092
- State: Palestine
- Governorate: Hebron

Government
  - Type: Village council

Population (2017)
  - Total: 686

Umm al-Khair (Arabic: أم الخير, lit. 'Mother of Benevolence') is a Palestinian village located in the Hebron Governorate in the southern West Bank. It was inhabited by five families, roughly 70 people, in 2008. By 2017, the population of the village was 686. The village is engulfed by the Israeli settlement of Carmel.

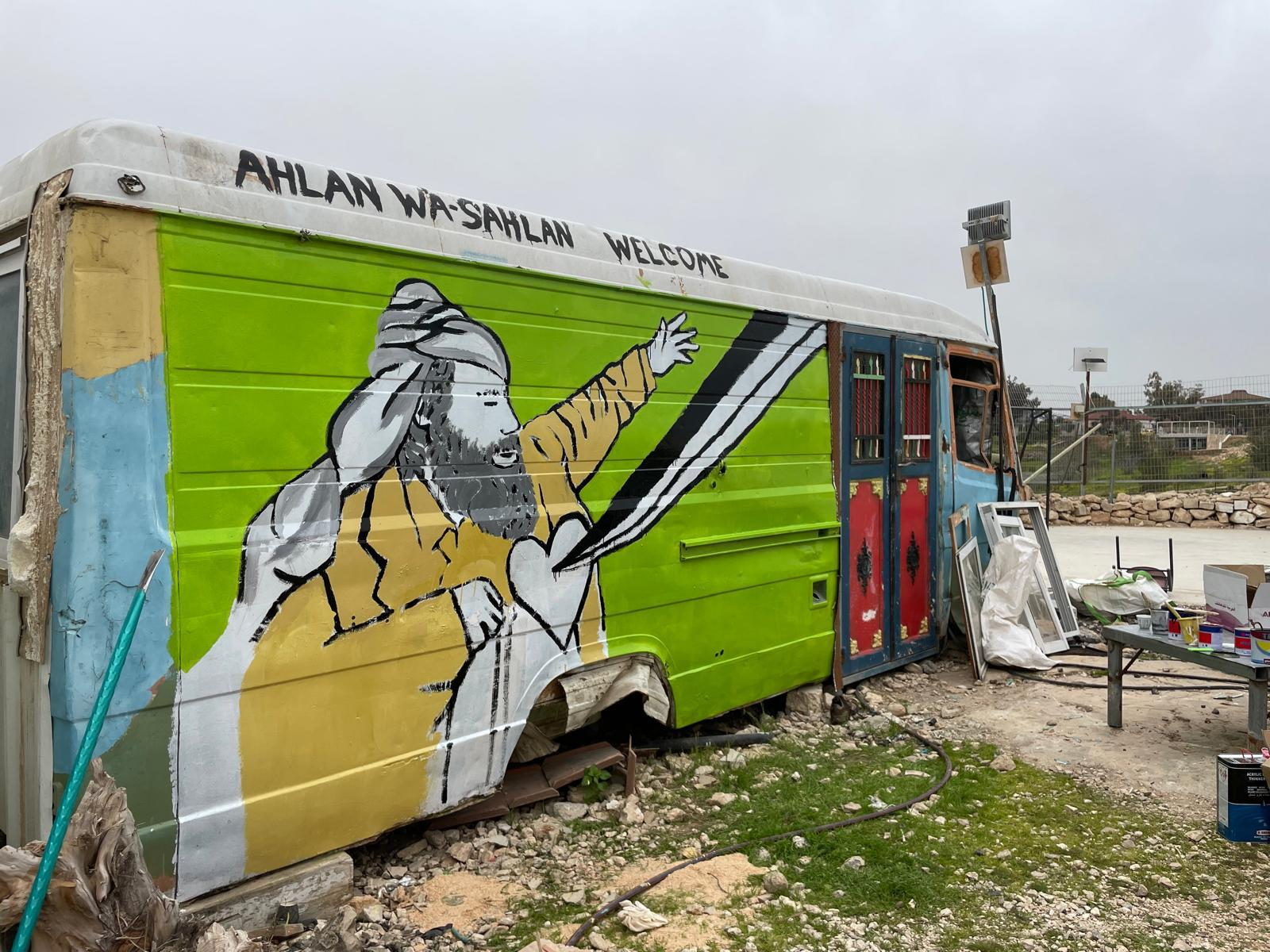
Street art in Umm al-Khair

== History ==
In 1883, the PEF's Survey of Western Palestine noted "piles of stones" at Rujm Umm Kheir (rujm standing for 'cairn').

The Palestinian villagers settled there several decades ago, after Israel expelled them from the Arad desert, and purchased the land from residents in the Palestinian village of Yatta.

In the wake of the 1948 War and after the 1949 Armistice Agreements, Umm al-Khair came under Jordanian rule.

During the Six-Day War in 1967, Umm al-Khair came under Israeli occupation. According to David Shulman, the nearby settlement, Carmel, lies on lands confiscated from the Bedouins of that village.

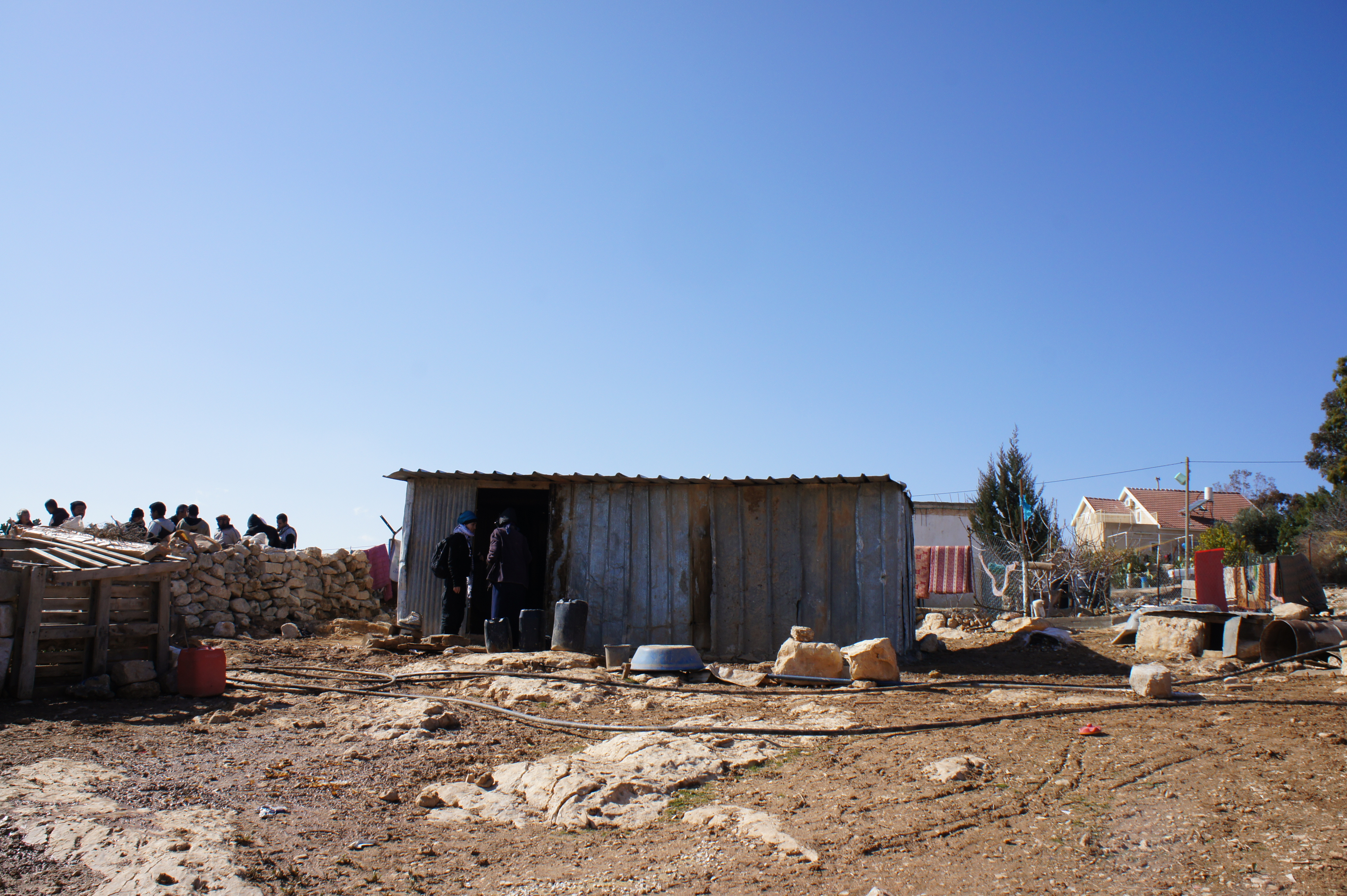
To the left: the rubble of the home of a widow with 9 children, Israeli troops demolished her house on the 25th of January 2012. In the middle: the tinshack she now has to live in with her children in Umm al-Khair.

Human rights activists and reporters have criticized the lack of amenities for the villagers while settlers nearby enjoy modern life. According to Nicholas Kristof of The New York Times, in 2010, Carmel is

'a lovely green oasis that looks like an American suburb. It has lush gardens, kids riding bikes and air-conditioned homes. It also has a gleaming, electrified poultry barn that it runs as a business.' Beyond its barbed wire fencing, the Bedouins of Umm al-Kheir in shanties are denied connection to the electricity grid, barns for their livestock and toilets, and all attempts to build permanent dwellings are demolished. Elad Orian, an Israeli human rights activist, noted that the chickens of Carmel's poultry farm get more electricity and water than the Palestinian Bedouin nearby.

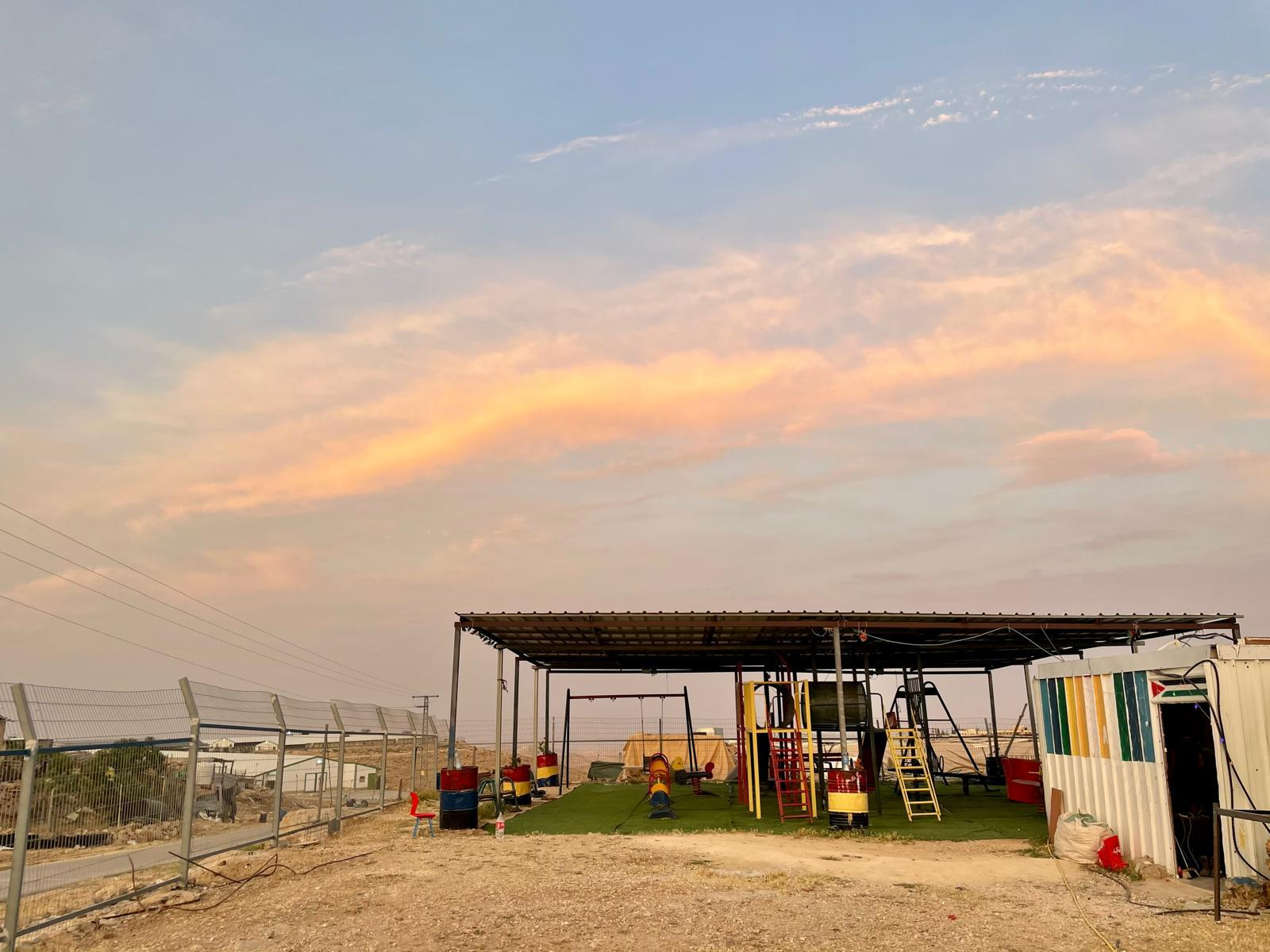
Children's park in Umm al-Khair

Hammerman writes as follows in 2011:

Right next to the stately country homes - complete with air-conditioning, drip-irrigation gardens and goldfish ponds - a few extended families including old men, old women and infants live in dwellings made of tin, cloth and plastic siding, though there are a few cinder-block structures, too. They tread on broken, barren ground. They have no running water. They are not connected to the power grid that lights up every settlement and outpost in this remote region. They have no access road.

David Dean Shulman has taken down the account of one of the villagers, a young man named ‘Id al-Hajalin, who after outlining their difficulties, showed two documents, a receipt for taxes he paid on his land, and another, an order from the Military Authorities to demolish his home. He commented:

“Why do they want to destroy my house? Where can I go? Can I go to America? I have nothing, and they want to take that nothing from me. Can you help me? Where am I supposed to go?”

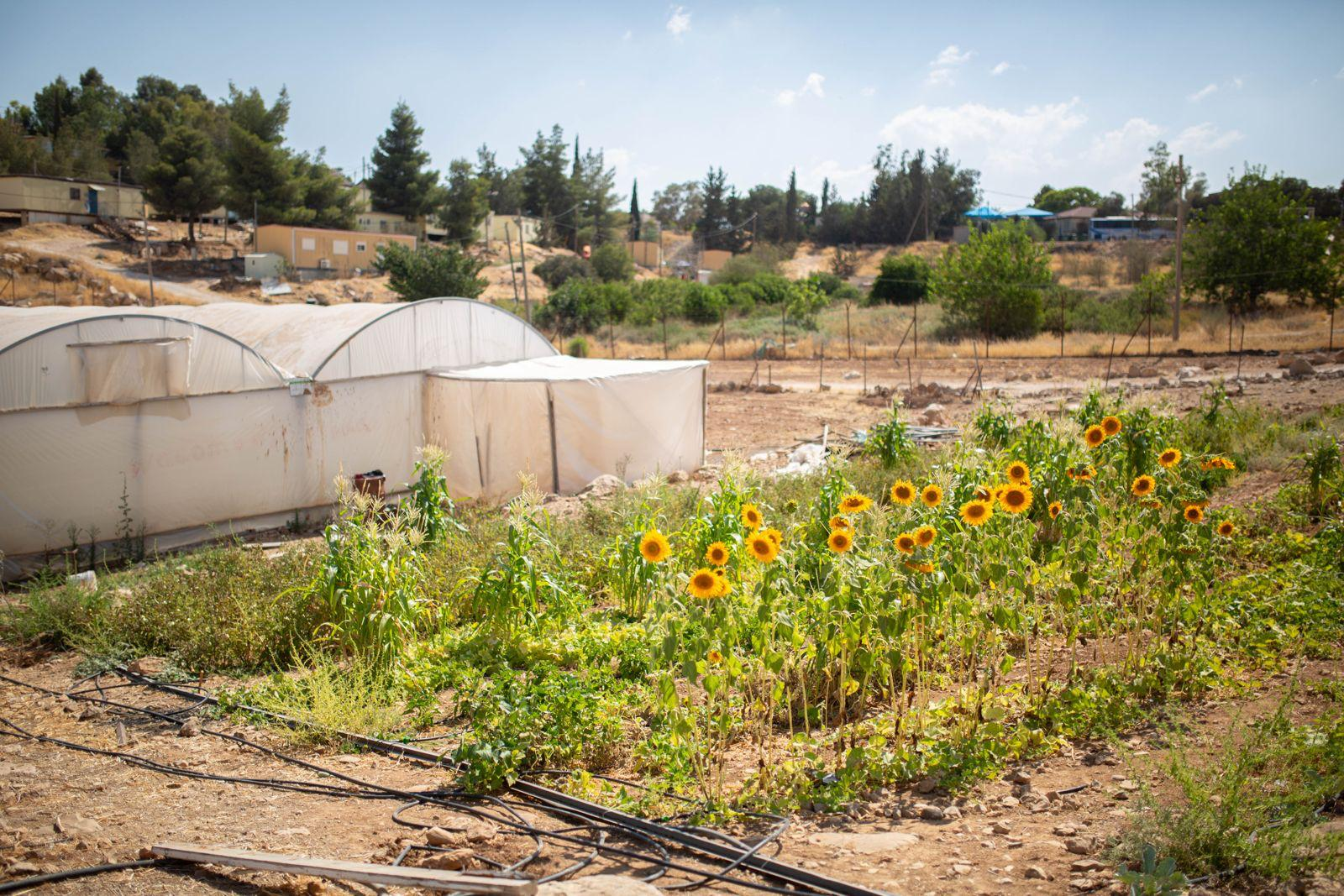
Cultivated land in Umm al-Khair

Umm al-Khair was one of the main subjects of the 2016 book The Way to the Spring: Life and Death in Palestine by Ben Ehrenreich.

Umm al-Khair is also the base community for the Good Shepherd Collective, a grassroots organization resisting the intrusive colonization of local land by Israeli settlers.

In June 2024, a third of the village still standing was demolished as the IDF bulldozed 11 houses, including 5 tent residences, leaving 50 shepherds homeless. They also destroyed electricity generator, solar cells and water tanks.

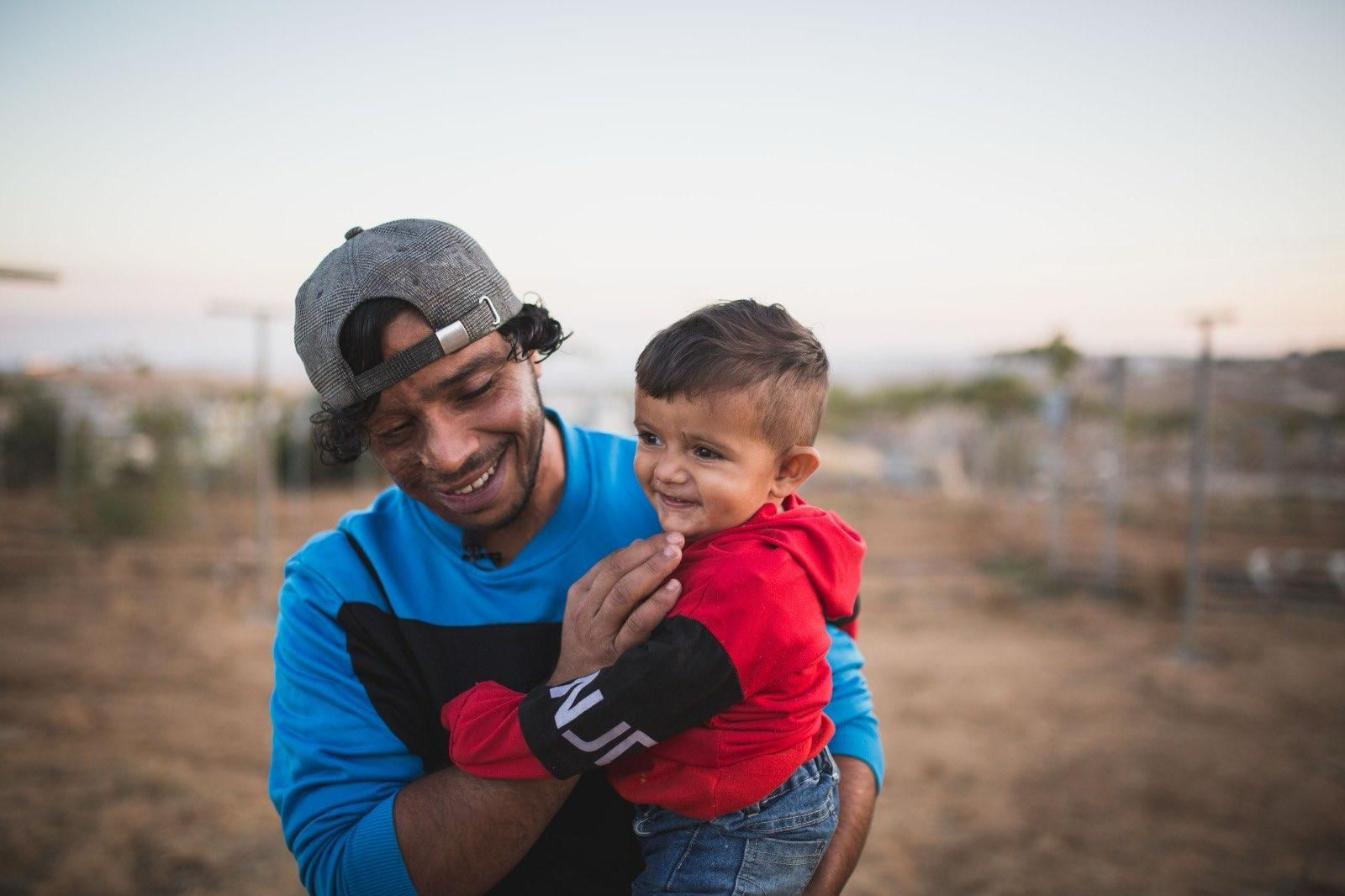
Umm al-Khair activist Awdah Hathaleen with his son Watan

On 28 July 2025, local activist Awdah Hathaleen was killed by an Israeli settler in his hometown.

== Bibliography ==
- Conder, C.R.; Kitchener, H.H. (1883). The Survey of Western Palestine: Memoirs of the Topography, Orography, Hydrography, and Archaeology. Vol. 3. London: Committee of the Palestine Exploration Fund.
- Palmer, E.H. (1881). The Survey of Western Palestine: Arabic and English Name Lists Collected During the Survey by Lieutenants Conder and Kitchener, R. E. Transliterated and Explained by E.H. Palmer. Committee of the Palestine Exploration Fund.
