= Carmel (Israeli settlement) =

Israeli settlement in the West Bank

Carmel: כרמל (Hebrew)
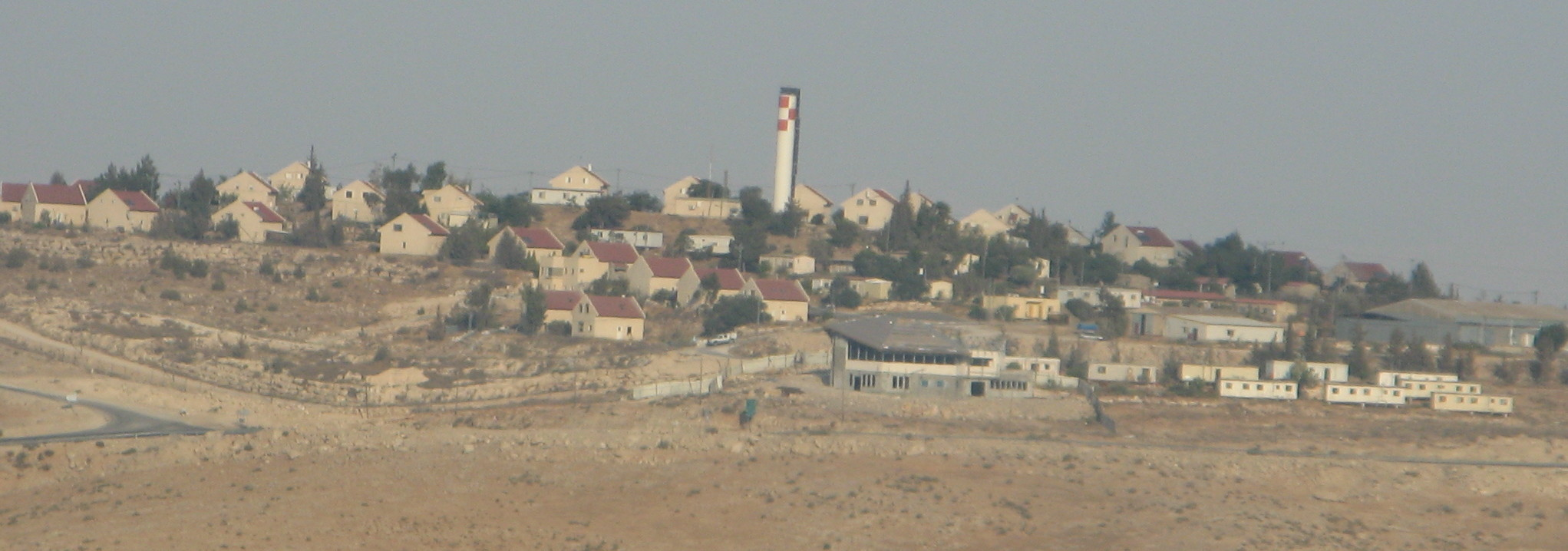

- Location within the Southern West Bank Location within the West Bank
- Coordinates: 31°25′54″N 35°10′58″E
- Country: Palestine
- District: Judea and Samaria Area
- Council: Har Hevron
- Region: West Bank
- Affiliation: Amana
- Founded: 1980
- Population (2024): 678

Carmel (Hebrew: כרמל) is an Israeli settlement organized as a moshav in the south-east Mount Hebron (Har Hevron in Hebrew) area of the West Bank. It falls under the jurisdiction of the Har Hevron Regional Council and associates ideologically with the Amana settlement movement. In 2024 it had a population of 678.

The settlement is close to the Israeli settlement of Ma'on, a moshav shitufi which shares a dairy cow farm with Carmel. It is also close to the village of Umm al-Kheir settled by Palestinian Bedouins, which has drawn criticism of Israel due to the difference in living conditions under Israeli occupation of the West Bank. The international community considers Israeli settlements in the West Bank illegal under international law, but the Israeli government disputes this.

== Etymology ==
The name Carmel was chosen due to the moshav's close proximity to the location of biblical Carmel (Joshua 15:55). Carmel is mentioned in 1 Samuel 25:2 as a place where Nabal of Maon had property.

== History ==
Palestinian Bedouins from Umm al-Kheir settled there several decades after Israel expelled them from the Arad desert. The Bedouins purchased the land from residents in the Palestinian village of Yatta. According to Israeli peace activist David Shulman, Carmel lies on lands appropriated from the Bedouins of that village.

Carmel was initially founded in 1980, next to the land on which the Hadaleen Bedouin tribe live, as a Nahal military-establishment through a "military seizure order". The settlement was "civilianized" in 1981.

Reuta Beth midrash was established in 2001 which is also a hesder yeshiva.

In 2011, a Haaretz article discussed the differences between Carmel and Umm al-Kheir, which are divided by a barbed wire fence. The article described Carmel homes as having "stately country homes" while Umm al-Kheir residents lived in homes made of tin, cloth, and plastic, or of cinder block. Describing Umm al-Kheir, the article says: "They have no running water. They are not connected to the power grid that lights up every settlement and outpost in this remote region. They have no access road." In a 2014 New York Times editorial, American journalist Nicholas Kristof described the Israeli occupation of the West Bank as "morally repugnant", comparing the living conditions of Carmel to those in Umm al-Kheir. Kristof wrote that Palestinians were barred from accessing electricity and lived in tents and huts as the Israeli army demolished any permanent structure they erected. In contrast, Kristof described Carmel as "a lovely green oasis that looks like an American suburb."
