= Declarations of State Land in the West Bank =

Designating occupied territory as "state land"

Declarations of State Land in the West Bank are declarations by Israeli authorities that Palestinian land is "state land", that is, land that may be legally administered by an occupying power on a temporary basis under international law, on the theory that the occupier is holding the territory in trust until sovereignty can be restored. It was and is the principal method used by the governments of Mandatory Palestine and Israel respectively, to acquire land from Palestinians and sell it to Israeli settlers. According to B'Tselem, it was used to expropriate 16% of the West Bank. Similar large land declarations include the declaration of Israeli firing zones in the West Bank.

== Historical background ==
There is a complex mix of still-operative, Ottoman, British, Jordanian, Israeli, Palestinian and international law at work in the West Bank. Land and villages of the West Bank did not have a cadastral survey during the Palestine Mandate. By the Six Day War of 1967, only a third of the land had been registered.

== Regulatory position and procedure ==
The Custodian Staff Officer of the Civil Administration (also Supervisor of Governmental and Abandoned Property in "Judea and Samaria") is the representative of the Israel Land Authority to the West Bank, whose responsibilities include the declaration of public land (“state land”). The declaration procedure is an internal process of the Civil Administration. Usually the Custodian signs a certificate specifying the location and area of the land along with a map. The certificate is sent to the mukhtars of affected villages. Objections must be submitted within 45 days and if not, the declaration is considered final and the Custodian may take possession of the land.

== Elon Moreh case ==
A 1979 proceedings known as the "Elon Moreh" case (Dweikat et al. v. Government of Israel) the Israeli Supreme Court ended the use of military orders for the seizure of private Palestinian land for settlements and provided the impetus for Israel to establish a new legal basis for the requisition of land if it was to be used for settlement. Following this case, during the period 1979 to 1992, 908,000 dunums were declared as state land based on a "stringent interpretation" of the 1858 Ottoman Land Code.

== Blue Line task force ==
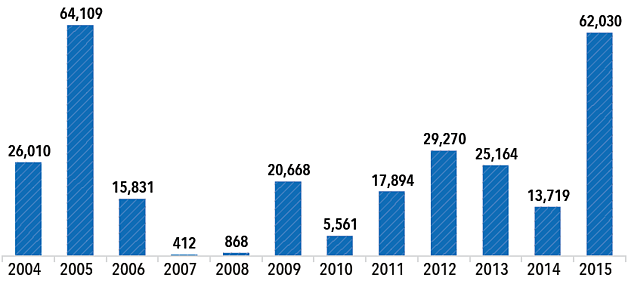
Area of "state land" declarations ratified by year (in dunums)

In 1999, the "Blue Line Task Force" was created to re-examine land not clearly designated as State land during the 1980s. The approval of this task force is a precondition for new settlement construction plans.

== Declarations after 2014 ==
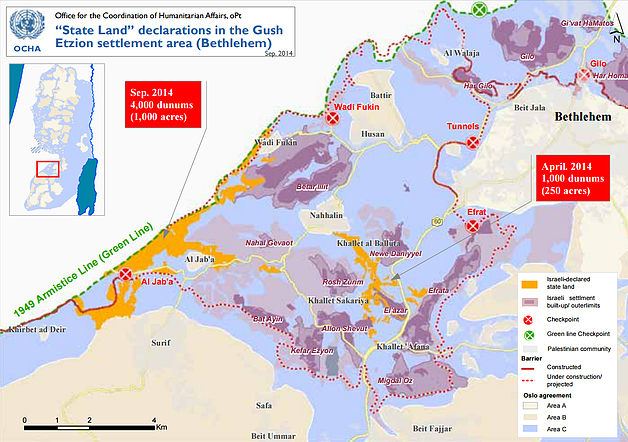
"State Land" declarations in the Gush Etzion settlement area (Bethlehem)

According to Peace Now, declarations had ceased after the roadmap was concluded in 2003 but that following Netanyahu's taking office in 2009, declarations totalled more than 6000 dunums as of the end of 2015. In late August 2014, in what was widely reported as a land grab, the authorities announced the appropriation 988 acres (3,799 dunums), defining private land south of Bethlehem as state land, which Peace Now said was the largest confiscation of Palestinian land in three decades. Then, on March 10, 2016, 2,342 dunams (580 acres) south of Jericho were declared as state land.

== See also ==
- Israeli land and property laws
- Survey of Palestine

== Bibliography ==
- Hadawi, Sami (1957). "Land ownership in Palestine". Palestine Arab Refugee Office.
- Sami Hadawi (Editor), "Palestine Partitioned, 1947–1958", Series: League of Arab States, Document Collections, No. 3 (New York: Arab Information Center, 1959)
- Hadawi, Sami (September 10, 2007). "Village statistics, 1945: A classification of land and area ownership in Palestine". PalestineRemembered.com.
- Bakir, Abu Kishk (1981). "Arab Land and Israeli Policy". Journal of Palestine Studies. 11 (1): 124–135. doi:10.2307/2536050. JSTOR 2536050.
- Shehadeh, Raja (1982). "The Land Law of Palestine: An Analysis of the Definition of State Lands". Journal of Palestine Studies. 11 (2): 82–99. doi:10.2307/2536271. JSTOR 2536271.

See also:Shehadeh, Raja (1983). Jewish settlements in the occupied West Bank – how the land was acquired for their use and how they are structured (Report). EIGHTH UNITED NATIONS SEMINAR ON THE QUESTION OF PALESTINE (9-13 May 1983, Jakarta, Indonesia).

- Kenneth W. Stein (1984). The Land Question in Palestine, 1917-1939. University of North Carolina Press. ISBN 978-0-8078-4178-5.
- Shehadeh, Raja (1984). "Some Legal Aspects of Israeli Land Policy in the Occupied Territories". Arab Studies Quarterly. 7 (2/3): 42–61. JSTOR 41857768.
- Bisharat, George E. (Winter 1994). "Land, Law, and Legitimacy in Israel and the Occupied Territories". American University Law Review. 43 (2): 467–561. doi:10.1017/S0731126500011410. S2CID 150542926.
- Bunton, Martin (1999). "Inventing the Status Quo: Ottoman Land-Law during the Palestine Mandate, 1917-1936". The International History Review. 21 (1): 28–56. doi:10.1080/07075332.1999.9640851. JSTOR 40108915.
- Tyler, Warwick P. N. (2001). State Lands and Rural Development in Mandatory Palestine, 1920-1948. Sussex Academic Press. ISBN 978-1-902210-75-9.
- Forman, Geremy; Kedar, Alexandre (2003). Colonialism, Colonization, and Land Law in Mandate Palestine: The Zor al-Zarqa and Barrat Qisarya Land Disputes in Historical Perspective (Report). Theoretical Inquiries in Law.
- Bunton, Martin (5 April 2007). Colonial Land Policies in Palestine 1917-1936. OUP Oxford. ISBN 978-0-19-921108-1.
- Orpett, Natalie (January 2012). "The Archaeology of Land Law: Excavating Law in the West Bank". International Journal of Legal Information. 40 (3): 344–392. doi:10.1017/S0731126500011410. S2CID 150542926.
- Sfard, Michael; Schaeffer, Emily (2012). A Guide to Housing, Land and Property Law in Area C of the West Bank (PDF) (Report). European Commission Humanitarian Aid and Civil Protection & Norwegian Refugee Council.
- Essaid, Aida (4 December 2013). "Land Settlement, Surveys and Disputes". Zionism and Land Tenure in Mandate Palestine. Routledge. pp. 97–102. ISBN 978-1-134-65361-4.
- United Nations High Commissioner for Human Rights (August 25, 2014). Israeli settlements in the Occupied Palestinian Territory, including East Jerusalem, and the occupied Syrian Golan Report by the Secretary-General (Report). UN.
- Etkes, Dror (December 1, 2016). Blue and White make Black:the work of Blue Line team in the West Bank (PDF) (Report). Kerem Navot.
- Shafir, Gershon (25 April 2017). A Half Century of Occupation: Israel, Palestine, and the World's Most Intractable Conflict. University of California Press. ISBN 978-0-520-96673-4.
- Fields, Gary (5 September 2017). Enclosure: Palestinian Landscapes in a Historical Mirror. Univ of California Press. ISBN 978-0-520-29104-1.
- Kanonich, Yonatan (December 2017). Through the Lens of Israel's Interests, the Civil Administration in the West Bank (PDF) (Report). Yesh Din.
- Blecher, Martin (15 October 2018). Israeli Settlements: Land Politics beyond the Geneva Convention. Rowman & Littlefield. ISBN 978-0-7618-7065-4.
