= Khirbet Susya =

Village in West Bank, Palestine

Khirbet Susya سوسية Arabic
- village
- Location of Susya Khirbet Susya (the Southern West Bank) Khirbet Susya (State of Palestine)
- Coordinates: 31°24′5″N 35°6′31″E
- State: State of Palestine
- Region: West Bank
- Governorate: Hebron

Population (2017)
  - Total: 199
- Time zone: UTC+2 (IST)
  - Summer (DST): UTC+3 (IDT)

Khirbet Susya (Arabic: سوسية, Hebrew: סוּסְיָא) is a Palestinian village in the West Bank. Palestinian villagers reported as living in caves and nearby tents are considered as belonging to a unique southern Hebron cave-dwelling culture present in the area since the early 19th century. The village had a population of 199 residents in 2017.

In 1982, an Israeli land authority, Plia Albeck, working in the Civil division of the State Attorney's Office, determined that the 300 hectares were Palestinians had been living, and which included an area with remains both of a 5th–8th century CE synagogue and of a mosque that had replaced it, were privately owned by the Palestinian Susya villagers. In 1983, an Israeli settlement also named Susya was established next to the Palestinian village. In 1986, the Israeli Defense Ministry's Civil Administration declared the entire area owned by Palestinians an archeological site, and the Israeli Defense Forces expelled the Palestinian owners from their dwellings and appointed Israeli settlers from the recently built settlement to manage the site. Some of the expropriated Palestinian land was incorporated into the jurisdictional area of the Israeli settlement, and an illegal Israeli outpost was established on the area of the previous Palestinian village.

The expelled Palestinians moved a few hundred meters southeast of their original village and built new shelters on agricultural land. After the murder of Yair Har-Sinai from the nearby Israeli settlement, in 2001, the Palestinian village was demolished for the second time.

Having since been rebuilt, there are currently new demolition orders standing for the structures of the Palestinian village.

The population of the Palestinian community reportedly numbered 350 in 2012 and 250 residents the following year, which constituted by 50 nuclear families (2015), up from 25 in 1986 and 13 in 2008.

== Origins and background ==
Khirbet Susya, called Susya al-Qadima ('Old Susya'), is a village attached to the archaeological site of Susya.

In the early 19th century, many residents of the two big villages in the area of South Mount Hebron, Yatta and Dura, started to immigrate to ruins and caves in the area and became 'satellite villages' (daughters) to the mother town. Purported reasons for the expansion were lack of land for agriculture and construction in the mother towns, which resulted in high prices of land and rivalries between the mother-towns clans wishing to control more land and resources. Another reason may have been security, as the ‘satellite villages’ would have served a security buffer against gangs of robbers who would raid the mother villages. Caves are used by locals as residences, storage space and sheepfold. The affiliation between the satellite villages and mother town remained. While some of the satellites became permanent villages with communities of 100s, others remained temporary settlements which served shepherds and fallāḥīn (farmers) for several months every year. In 1981-2 it was estimated 100-120 families dwelt in caves permanently in the South Mount Hebron region while 750-850 families lived there temporarily.

Yaakov Havakook, who lived with the locals in the region for several years, writes that the community at Khirbet Susya was seasonal and didn't live in the caves year-round. Families of shepherds arrived after the first rain (October–November), stayed during the grazing season and left in late April or early May. They were known for a special kind of cheese produced in their caves, and lived by harvesting olives, herding sheep, growing crops, and beekeeping.

According to Rabbi for Human Rights, in 1948, the preexisting population was augmented by an influx of Palestinian refugees who had fled during the 1948 Arab–Israeli War from the area of Ramat Arad, who subsequently purchased land in the area. After coming under Israeli civil authority in 1982, an Israel settlement planner, Plia Albeck, examined the area of Susiya, the synagogue and the Palestinian village built on and around it, and finding it legally difficult to advance Jewish settlement, wrote:

“The [ancient] synagogue is located in an area that is known as the lands of Khirbet Susya, and around an Arab village between the ancient ruins. There is a formal registration on the land of Khirbet Susya with the Land Registry, according to which this land, amounting to approximately 3000 dunam [approximately 741 acres], is privately held by many Arab owners. Therefore the area proximal to the [ancient] synagogue is in all regards privately owned.”

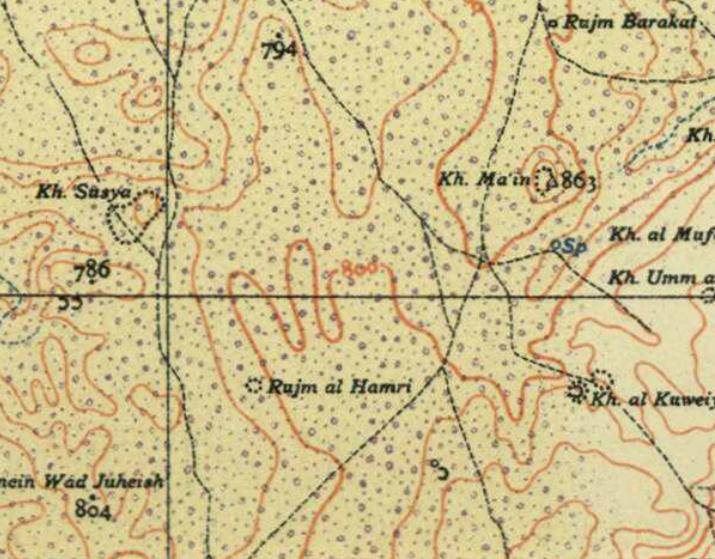
Map of Kh. Susya and Rujum al-Hamri from 1936

In June 1986, Israel expropriated the Palestinian village's residential ground for an archeological site, evicting about 25 families. The expelled Susyans settled in caves and tin shacks nearby, on their agricultural lands at a site now called Rujum al-Hamri, to restart their lives.

The Israeli government official stance on the matter says: “There was no historic Palestinian village at the archaeological site there; that the village consists of only a few seasonal residences for a few families; and the land is necessary for the continuation of archaeological work.” According to Regavim, an NGO which petitioned the Supreme Court to execute the demolition orders at Khirbet susya, the place was used as grazing area and olive agricalture seasonally before 1986. In a report, Regavim writes that travelers from the late 19th century report finding ruins (while nearby Semua was reported as inhabited). The British census from 1945 does not mention Susya and, according to Regavim, a survey from 1967, done after Six-Day War, refers to Khirbat Susya as ruins in contrast to nearby villages such as At-Tuwani, Yatta.

== Land ownership and master plan ==
A master plan was not approved and building permit were not given to Khirbet Susya because there was no sufficient proof of ownership as the documents lack geographic information and based on them, it was "not possible to make unambiguous claims of ownership over the land in question". The Jabor family supports a claim to land near Susya with Ottoman documents dated back to 1881 and the Nawaja family, who is originally from the Tel Arad area and moved to Susya in 1952, has documents as well. Their documents are problematic since the boundaries mentioned were described in terms of geography features which are hard to identify in the field.

In July 2015 it was published that according to an internal document of findings by the Israeli Civil Administration officer Moshe Meiri, the claim to ownership of the land appears to be grounded on a valid Ottoman period title, dating back to 1881, in the possession of the Jabor family. This document appears to have been known to Israeli officials since the advent of civil administration in 1982. Though the precise extent of their land was not specified in the document, in an internal review of the case in 2015, Meiri established from the geographical features mentioned that the land covered territory now belonging to the Jabor and Nawaja families, and the villages on the basis of their Ottoman period documents claim an area that covers some 3,000 dunams (741 acres). In early 1986, Before the first Israeli expulsion, the village was visited by U.S. consular officials, who recorded the occasion in photographs.

== Additional expulsions ==
According to David Shulman, Ta'ayush activist, the second expulsion took place in 1990, when Rujum al-Hamri's inhabitants were loaded onto trucks by the IDF and dumped at the Zif Junction, 15 kilometers northwards near a roadside at the edge of a desert. Most returned and rebuilt on a rocky escarpment within their traditional agricultural and grazing territory. Their wells taken, they were forced to buy water from nearby Yatta. Palestinian residents (2012) pay 25 NIS per cubic meter water brought in by tanks, which is 5 times the cost to the nearby Israeli settlement. Net consumption, at 28 litres per diem, is less than half what Palestinians consume (70 lpd) and less than the recommended WHO level. Israel sheep-herding settlers expanded their unfenced land use at Mitzpe Yair, the "Dahlia Farm" a term used by Susiya Palestinians to refer to the farm run by the widow of Yair Har-Sinai. According to B'tselem, by 2010 settlers were cultivating roughly 40 hectares, about 15% of the land area to which they deny access to the traditional Palestinian users of that area. Since 2000 Jewish settlers in Susya have denied Palestinians access to 10 cisterns in the area, or according to more recent accounts, 23, and try to block their access to others. Soil at Susya, with a market value of NIS 2,000 per truckload, is also taken from lands belonging to the village of Yatta.

The third expulsion occurred in June 2001, in the midst of the second intifada, when settler civilians and soldiers drove the Palestinians of Susya out without warning. The Palestinians were reportedly driven out through violent arrests and beatings. On 3 July 2001, the Israeli army demolished dozens of homes in Susya and contiguous Palestinian villages, and bulldozed their cisterns, many ancient, built for gathering rainwater, and then filled them with gravel and cement to hinder their reuse. Donated solar panels were also destroyed, livestock were killed, and agricultural land was razed.. On Sept 26 of the same year, by an order of the Israeli Supreme Court, these structures were ordered to be destroyed and the land returned to the Palestinians. Settlers and the IDF prevented the villagers from reclaiming their land, some 750 acres. The villagers made an appeal to the same court to be allowed to reclaim their lands and live without harassment. Some 93 events of settler violence were listed. The settlers made a counter-appeal, and one family that had managed to return to its land suffered a third eviction.

In 2002 an Israeli outpost was established without the necessary building permit. OCHA reports that as of 2012 the Israeli Civil Administration has imposed no demolitions on this outpost, which is connected to Israel's water and electricity networks, and cites the example as putative evidence that Israeli policy is discriminating between the two communities.

In 2006, structures without a permit were demolished illegally on the orders of a low-ranking officer, and the demolition was strongly criticized 3 years later by the High Court of Israel. In September 2008 the Israeli army informed the Palestinians at Susya that a further 150 dunums (15 hectares), where 13 remaining rainwater cisterns are located, would be a "closed military area" to which they were denied access. Amnesty International described the resultant contrast between the Palestinian and Jewish Susyas as follows:

"in the nearby Israeli settlement of Sussia, whose very existence is unlawful under international law, the Israeli settlers have ample water supplies. They have a swimming pool and their lush irrigated vineyards, herb farms and lawns – verdant even at the height of the dry season – stand in stark contrast to the parched and arid Palestinian villages on their doorstep."

According to David Shulman, for some decades they were subject to many violent attacks, and though winning in the courts, the settlers would ignore the orders and drive them out. The BBC broadcast film of settler youths beating an old woman and her family with cudgels to drive them away from their land, in 2008. Local villages, like Palestinian Susya, have been losing land, and being cut off from each other, as the nearby settlements of Carmel, Maon, Susya and Beit Yatir began to be built and developed, and illegal outposts established. David Dean Shulman described the reality he observed in 2008:

Susya: where thirteen impoverished families are clinging tenaciously, but probably hopelessly, to the dry hilltop and the few fields that are all that remain of their vast ancestral lands.

According to B'tselem, the Palestinians that remain in the area live in tents on a small rocky hill between the settlement and the archeological park which is located within walking distance. According to Amnesty International, ten caves inhabited by Susya Palestinian families were blown up by the IDF in 1996, and some 113 tents were destroyed in 1998. Amnesty International also reports that official documents asking them to leave the area address them generically as 'intruders' (polesh/intruder). Most of the rain-catching water cisterns used by the local Palestinian farmers of Susya were demolished by the Israeli army in 1999 and 2001. A local Susya resident told Amnesty International,

'Water is life; without water we can’t live; not us, not the animals, or the plants. Before we had some water, but after the army destroyed everything we have to bring water from far away; it’s very difficult and expensive. They make our life very difficult, to make us leave.'

While the Israeli settlement has mains power and piped water from Israel, the Palestinians depend on solar panels and wind turbine energy made possible by a Palestinian/Israeli NGO – Comet - and on wells. This project has been shortlisted for the BBC World Challenge which highlighted the involvement of two Israeli physicists, Elad Orian and Noam Dotan. According to David Hirst, the inhabitants Susya, are faced with a catch-22. If they comply with the law they cannot build cisterns and collect even the rainwater. But if they fail to work their lands, they lose it anyway. One small enclave that remains for a Bedouin pastoralist's family suffers from further encroachment, with one settler, according to David Shulman, managing to wrest 95% of the family's land, and still intent on entering the remainder.

In a ruling delivered in December 2013, the Israel High Court of Justice accepted that Yatta Palestinians had shown their legal attachment to a stretch of land between Susya and the illegal settlement of Mitzpe Yair, but requested them to withdraw their petition against the settlers who are alleged to have illegally seized these lands. The subject of a petition concerns 300 dunams of agricultural land, and a further 900 dunams of pasture of which, the Palestinians argue, they were forced by violent attacks from using for agriculture and herding. The court held that the proper option open to the Palestinians was recourse to a civil legal action. Of the 120 complaints registered with Israeli police in Hebron by Palestinians of Susya, regarding alleged attacks, threats, incursions, and property damage wrought by settlers down to 2013, upwards of 95% have been dismissed, without charges being laid.

== Legal fight & demolition orders ==
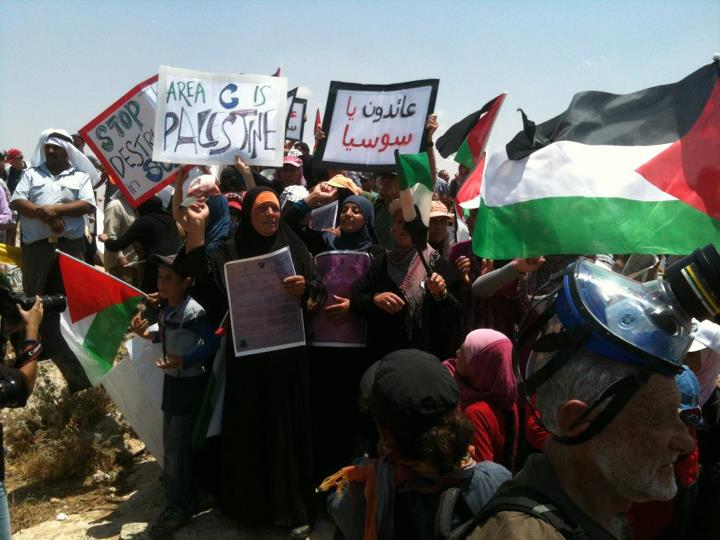
A Palestinian demonstration against the demolition of the village of Susya

After 1985, when the population was expelled, attempts by the Palestinian of Susya to rebuild their village have been razed by Israel four times, in 1991, 1997 and twice in 2001. Since it is classified within Area C of the West Bank, it lies under Israeli military occupation and control. Though they own much of the land, Israel denies building permits to Susya's residents and therefore they build without permission from Israeli authorities. The master plan for Susya was denied by the Israeli Civil Administration as opposed to the Israeli settlement of Susya, and Palestinians are required to obtain permits from the Israeli Civil Administration.

In 2008 the Supreme Court turned down the villagers' request for a staying order on planned demolition. According to Daviod Dean Shulman, the State attorney claimed that the Palestinians of Susya were a security threat to the settlers, and had to be moved. When asked by the judges where they would move to, the State replied:'We don’t know. They are unfortunates, miskenim.'.

In 2011, Israel executed 4 waves of demolition, affecting 41 structures, including 31 residential tents or shacks and two water cisterns. As a result, 37 people, including 20 children, were displaced and a further 70 affected. On November 24, 2011 bulldozers razed two tents where the Mughnem family dwells on their own land in Susya.

The Jewish settlers of Susya and the Israeli pro-settler association NGO Regavim petitioned the High Court to demolish Palestinian Susya, defining the villagers as 'trespassers' living in 'illegal outposts', terms usually applied to illegal Jewish outposts on the West Bank.

On June 14 an Israeli court issued 6 demolition orders covering 50 buildings including tent dwellings, ramshackle huts, sheep pens, latrines, water cisterns, a wind-and-sun powered turbine, and the German-funded solar panels in most of the Palestinian village of Susya. Over 500 people from Tel Aviv, Beer Sheva, and Jerusalem came to mount a peaceful protest on June 22.

On the 26th of June, 2013, the Israeli Civil Administration, a military body, raided Palestinian Susya and handed out 40 demolition orders for many structures, tents, hothouses, a water well and a solar panel, established on humanitarian grounds by the European Union. Nearby Israeli settlers built two additional and unauthorized houses in the Mitzpeh Avigayil outpost, without interference.

A local Palestinian declared to the Hebrew press:

They’re calling our village an illegal outpost. These lands are ours from before there was a State of Israel. My father is older than your state—and I am an illegal alien on my own land. I ask where is justice? Your courts distinguish between the settler and the Palestinian…We’re surrounded by illegal outposts [built by settlers] that have everything—infrastructures of water and electricity— despite the fact that these settlements are illegal even under Israeli law. And now you want to expel this old man from his home once again? To expel all of us who own these lands, who have lived on them for generations in this space that is ours, which is all we know?

In an exchange in the Knesset with Joint List Member Dov Khenin, who noted that Plia Albeck, a pro-settler former government official had admitted that in 1982 that Susya was surrounded by an Arab village, and that the land is registered at the Israeli Lands Authority as under private Arab title, a Rabbi from the Jewish Home Party, Deputy Defense Minister and new head of Israel’s Civil Administration, Eli Ben Dahan, publicly denied that Susya exists, asserting that attempts to protect the village were a ploy by leftists to take over Area C.

“There has never been an Arab village called Susya,” Ben Dahan said, calling the village “a ploy by leftist organizations to take over Area C [of the West Bank].”

On 24 August, a further demolition took place. On 29 August 2012 the IDF destroyed a sheepfold and two tents, one a dwelling and the other for storage, donated to the villagers of Palestinian Susya by the United Nations' Office for the Coordination of Humanitarian Affairs.

In May 2015, the Israel High Court approved the demolition of Palestinian Susya. The implementation of the plan was expected to leave 450 villagers homeless. A delegation of diplomats from 28 European countries visited Susya in June and urged Israel not to evict its 300 Palestinian residents, a move that would endanger in their view the two-state solution.

== International involvement ==
Israeli plans to demolish the Palestinian village have become an international cause célèbre. According to Amira Hass, before fifteen senior EU diplomats visited the area on 8 August 2012, Susya villager Nasser Nawaja'a complained that "(t)here are in this village octogenarians who are older than the State of Israel . . . How can they be told that their residence here is illegal?" The EU declared at the time it does not expect that the demolition order will be executed. An Israeli officer objected to this narrative, saying, "It would be absolutely false to present these people [the villagers] as having lived there since the time of Noah's Ark and suddenly the big bad Israelis come and destroy the place. We are a bit sad that some of the Europeans and the Americans are falling into that trap."

In July the US State Department urged Israel to refrain from any demolitions and asked it to seek a peaceful resolution with villagers, and the European Union issued a strongly worded admonition urging Israel to abandon plans for the "forced transfer of population and demolition of Palestinian housing and infrastructure" in Khirbet Susiya.

The EU funded the construction of buildings in Area C which is under interim Israeli jurisdiction, built without permits and which cost tens of millions of Euros. EU documents show the intention is to "pave the way for development and more authority of the PA over Area C". A spokesman said it was justified on humanitarian grounds while Ari Briggs, International Director of Regavim, said the project is a 'Trojan horse' with political aims. Susya was reported to be the 4th largest of such 17 'EU Settlements'.

== Bibliography ==
- Yaavoc Havakook (1985). Live in Caves of Mount Hebron. Tel Aviv: Defence Ministry publications. ISBN 9789650501983.
