= Avigayil =

Israeli settlement in the West Bank

Avigayil: אביגיל (Hebrew)
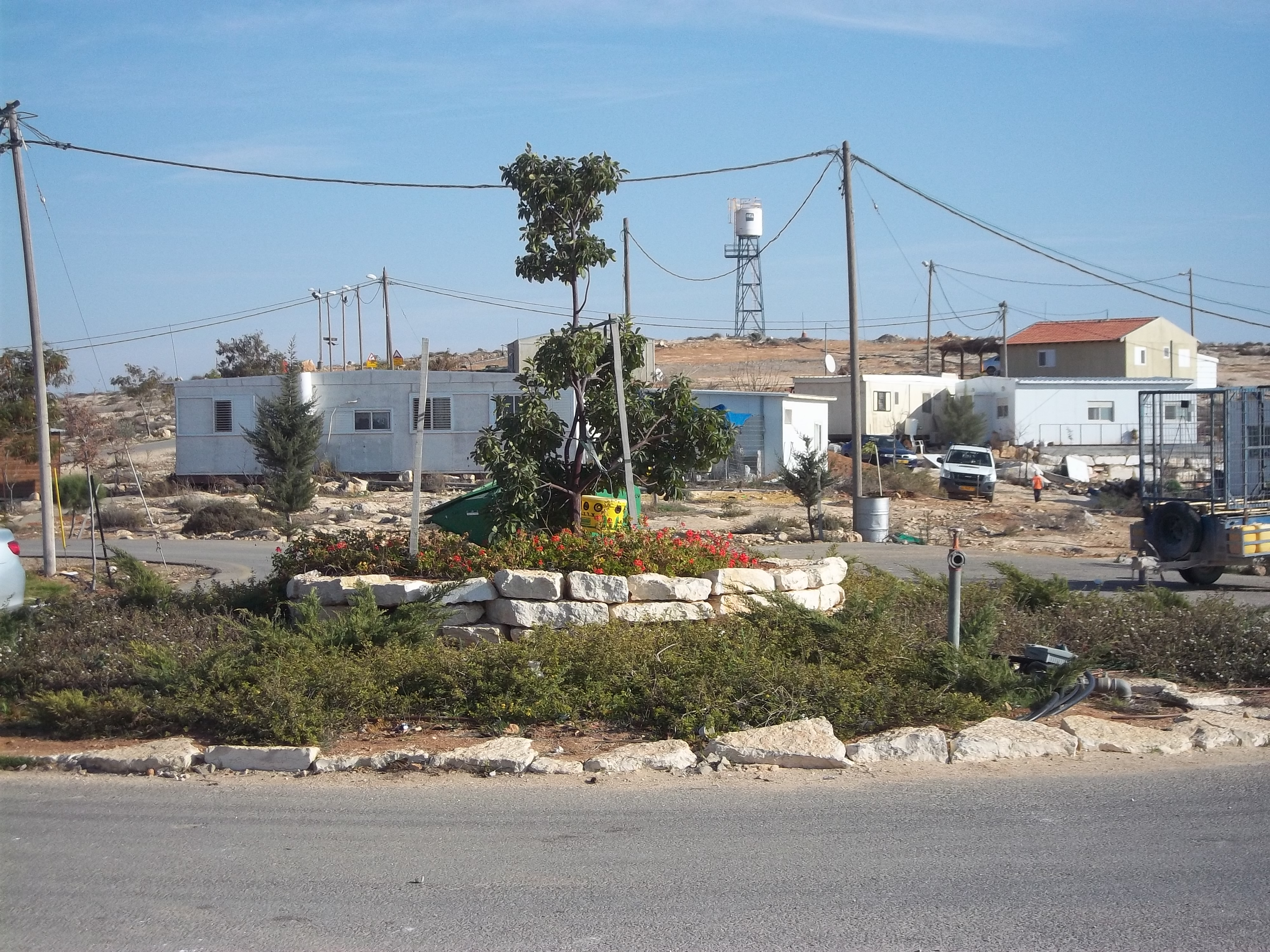

- Location within the Southern West Bank Location within the West Bank
- Coordinates: 31°24′13″N 35°08′26″E
- Country: Palestine
- District: Judea and Samaria Area
- Council: Har Hevron
- Region: West Bank
- Founded: October 2001, legalized February 2023
- Founder: Demobilized IDF soldiers
- Population (2011): 50

Avigayil (Hebrew: אביגיל) is an Israeli settlement in the West Bank. It lies between the settlements of Ma'on and Susya in the southern Hebron Hills. The settlement is situated east of the Israeli West Bank barrier, 4.7 km from the Green line on what is officially known as Hilltop 850. Established in October 2001 as an outpost, and legalized in February 2023, Avigayil has a population of roughly 50, consisting of 30 families as of 2014, up from 17 registered in 2010. It is within the municipal jurisdiction of the Har Hevron Regional Council.

The international community considers Israeli settlements in the West Bank illegal under international law, but the Israeli government disputes this.

== Etymology ==
Avigayil is named after the biblical Abigail, the wife of Nabal, who lived, according to the Bible, in a place in Judea called Maon.

== History ==
Avigayil was established on 1,000 dunams (250 acres) on Yom Kippur eve (26 September) 2001 by a group of newly discharged Israel Defense Forces soldiers on a hilltop chosen for its strategic location. It was created to prevent Palestinian attacks on a road below the hill. One its founders has stated that the main priority was to create a buffer between the Palestinians and Bedouin tribes, cutting off contiguous Arab settlements in a "line of settlements" as part of a chain of Israeli settlements and unauthorized outposts in the area that is rapidly expanding into a bloc including Havat Lucifer, Mitzpe Yair, Ma'on, Havat Maon and Carmel, Susya and Beit Yatir. Residents state that their presence aims specifically to assert land claims for Israel. The gradual expansion of residential and agricultural areas for settlers has been conducted side by side with regular efforts to deny Palestinian farmers and shepherds access to increasing portions of their land.

Immediately after the group moved onto the land, a High Court of Justice ruled a temporary injunction ordering a freeze on all development work on the site until an official ruling could be made regarding the status of the land. In 2003 Avigayil was one of 22 outposts slated for removal by Ariel Sharon as part of the Road Map. In 2014 Israeli Defense Minister Moshe Ya'alon announced that procedures were advancing to legalize the outpost.

The outpost was officially recognized by Israeli law in 2023.

== Settler attacks and impact on neighboring Palestinian communities ==
Shooting of Said Muhammad Raba al-Amur, 17 April 2025, al-Rakiz, Masafer Yatta, Palestine

Shooting of Said Muhammad Raba al-Amur, 17 April 2025, al-Rakiz, Masafer Yatta, Palestine

Since its establishment, Avigayil has been repeatedly cited by Israeli and international human rights organizations as a focal point of settler violence and territorial encroachment in the southern Hebron Hills. According to reports by B'Tselem, Yesh Din, and the United Nations Office for the Coordination of Humanitarian Affairs (OCHA), armed residents and the settlement's security coordinator have engaged in assaults, shootings, and intimidation campaigns targeting Palestinian shepherding communities in the nearby hamlets of Al-Rakiz, At-Tuwani, Tuba, and Maghayir al-Abeed.

Residents of these Palestinian communities report routine obstruction of grazing routes, damage to water infrastructure, and direct assaults during attempts to access agricultural lands. In several documented incidents, settlers from Avigayil—often accompanied by Israeli soldiers—have fired live ammunition, assaulted residents, or destroyed property. One of the most serious cases occurred on 17 April 2025, when the settlement's security coordinator shot 59-year-old shepherd Said Muhammad Raba al-Amur at point-blank range in Khirbet al-Rakiz, resulting in the amputation of his leg. Israeli soldiers arriving at the scene reportedly detained the wounded man and his son instead of the assailant.

In the years prior to this attack, Avigayil settlers were implicated in numerous assaults on Palestinian shepherds from Tuwan, including stone-throwing, beatings, and vandalism of tents and livestock pens. OCHA field surveys note that Avigayil's expansion—through new roads, grazing zones, and mobile homes—has effectively severed access between several Palestinian hamlets and their agricultural lands.

International and Israeli rights groups have described Avigayil as part of a pattern of settlement-driven displacement in Masafer Yatta, where Palestinians face overlapping threats of military eviction, land confiscation, and settler aggression. B'Tselem and Yesh Din have documented a lack of accountability for such attacks, noting that Israeli law enforcement rarely investigates or prosecutes incidents involving settlers from Avigayil and neighboring outposts.
