= Susya =

Susya سوسية Arabic סוּסְיָא Hebrew
- Village
- Location of Susya
- Coordinates: 31°23′31″N 35°6′44″E
- Governorate: Hebron
- Time zone: UTC+2 (IST)
  - Summer (DST): UTC+3 (IDT)

Susya (Arabic: سوسية, Hebrew: סוּסְיָא; Susiyeh, Susiya, Susia) is a location in the southern Hebron Governorate in the West Bank. It houses an archaeological site with extensive remains from the Late Roman and Byzantine periods, including the ruins of an archeologically notable synagogue, repurposed as a mosque after the Muslim conquest of Palestine in the 7th century. A Palestinian village named Susya was established near the site in the 1830s. The village lands extended over 300 hectares under multiple private Palestinian ownership, and the Palestinians on the site are said to exemplify a southern Hebron cave-dwelling culture present in the area since the early 19th century whose transhumant practices involved seasonal dwellings in the area's caves and ruins of Susya.

In 1982, an Israeli land authority, Plia Albeck, working in the Civil division of the State Attorney's Office, determined that the 300 hectares where Palestinians had been living, and which included an area with remains both of a 5th–8th century CE synagogue and of a mosque that had replaced it, were privately owned by the Palestinian Susya's villagers. In 1983, an Israeli settlement also named Susya was established next to the Palestinian village. In 1986, the Israeli Defense Ministry's Civil Administration declared the entire area owned by Palestinians an archeological site, and the Israeli Defense Forces expelled the Palestinian owners from their dwellings and appointed Israeli settlers from the recently built settlement to manage the site. Some of the expropriated Palestinian land was incorporated into the jurisdictional area of the Israeli settlement, and an illegal Israeli outpost was established on the area of the previous Palestinian village. The expelled Palestinians moved a few hundred meters southeast of their original village.

The Israeli government, which has issued injunctions against the Israeli Supreme Court's decisions to demolish illegal Israeli outposts, made a petition to the High Court to permit the demolition of the new Palestinian village. The state expressed a willingness to allocate what it called "Israeli government-owned lands" near Yatta for an alternative residence, and to assist rebuilding, considering it ideal for the displaced villagers grazing. Though the existence of the Palestinian village is attested on maps as early as 1917, confirmed by aerial photographs in 1980 that show cultivated farmland and livestock pens maintained by Palestinians on the site, the official view of Israel is that no historic Palestinian village ever existed there, just a few families residing seasonally, and that the area was required for archaeological work. It is notable that Jews also reside in illegal structures on the same archaeological site. The attorney for the Palestinians replied that the army was stopping Palestinians building on their own privately owned land, while permitting settlers to seize their agricultural fields.

The population of the Palestinian community has fluctuated. It reportedly numbered 350 villagers in 2012 and 250 residents the following year, constituted by 50 nuclear families (2015), up from 25 in 1986 and 13 in 2008. By 2018 17 families were reported to still be clinging on, working the few fields that remain to them of their former lands.

The international community considers Israeli settlements in the West Bank illegal under international law; the Israeli government disputes this.

== Name ==
The site is called in Arabic Khirbet Susiya, also spelled Susiyeh, which means "Ruin (khirbet) of the Liquorice Plant (susiya)" after a wild plant species widely growing there.

The spelling Susya represents the Hebrew name, as decided by the Israeli Naming Committee, in consultation with the settlers.

== History ==
=== Late Roman and Byzantine period town ===
Susiya is considered an important site for the study and research of ancient Jewish village life in Palestine during Late Antiquity. It was the site of a monumental synagogue. The settlement on the hill contiguous to the synagogue seems to have once had a thriving economy. A fine store has been excavated from its ruins. It may have undergone a decline in the second half of the 4th century, and again in the 6th century. Some speak of abandonment though the evidence from the synagogue suggests continuity into the medieval period.

According to Israel archaeologist Yonathan Mizrachi, the Jewish population is attested from the 4th to 6th century, after which a population change took place.

==== Theory: Susya as "new Carmel" ====
Susya, whether it refers to the site of the ancient synagogue or the ruins of the contiguous ancient and large settlement of some 80 dunams (80,000 m^{2}), is not mentioned in any ancient text, and Jewish literature did not register an ancient Jewish town on that site. It is thought by some to correspond to the Biblical Carmel (Joshua 15:5), a proposal made by Avraham Negev. Part of Negev's theory is that, in the wake of the Second Revolt (132–135), when the Romans garrisoned Khirbet el-Karmil, identified as the biblical Carmel, religious Jews uncomfortable with pagan symbols moved 2 km south-west to the present Susya (which they perhaps already farmed) and that, while they still regarded their new community as Carmel, the name was lost when the village's fortunes declined in the early Arab period, in part, it has been suggested, because the new Muslim overlords might not have tolerated its wine-based economy.

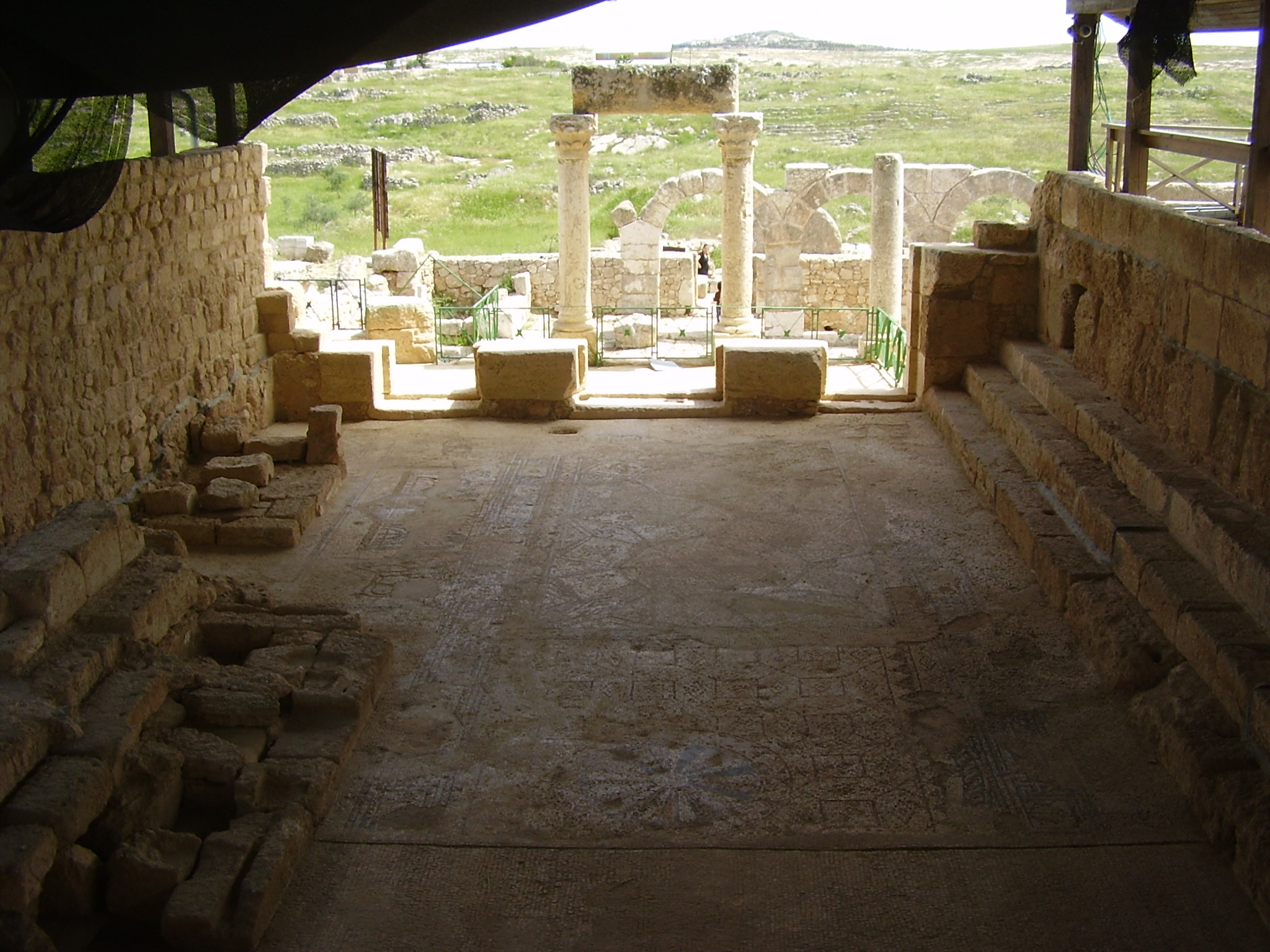
View of Susya

=== Ancient synagogue ===
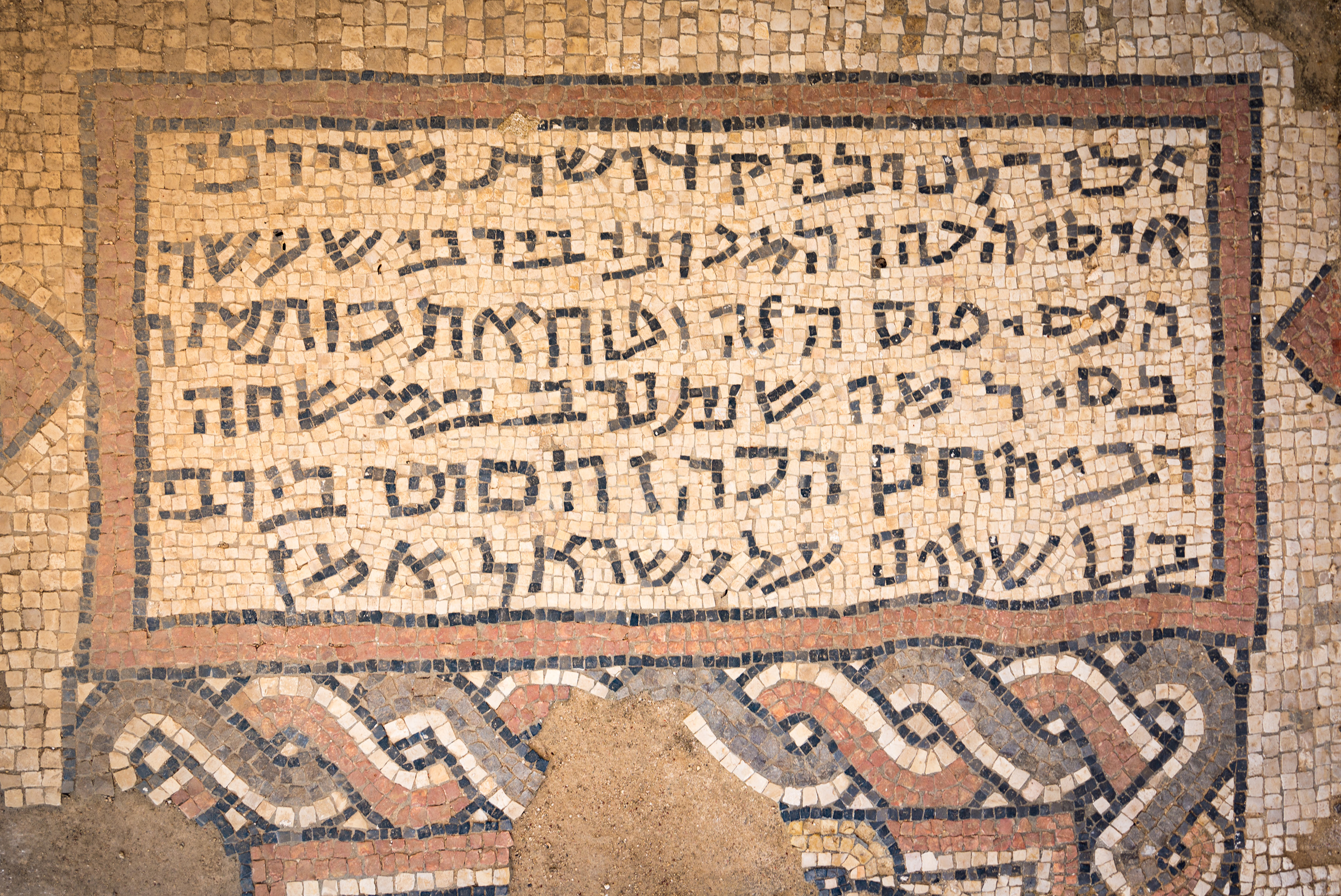
Susya synagogue mosaic with Hebrew inscription

Susiya is the site of an archaeologically notable ancient synagogue. The site was examined by Shmarya Guttman in 1969, who uncovered the narthex of a synagogue during a trial dig. He, together with Ze'ev Yeivin and Ehud Netzer, then conducted the Israeli excavations at Khirbet Suseya, (subsequently named by a Hebrew calque as Horvat Susya) over 1971–72, by the Palestinian village of Susiya Al-Qadime.

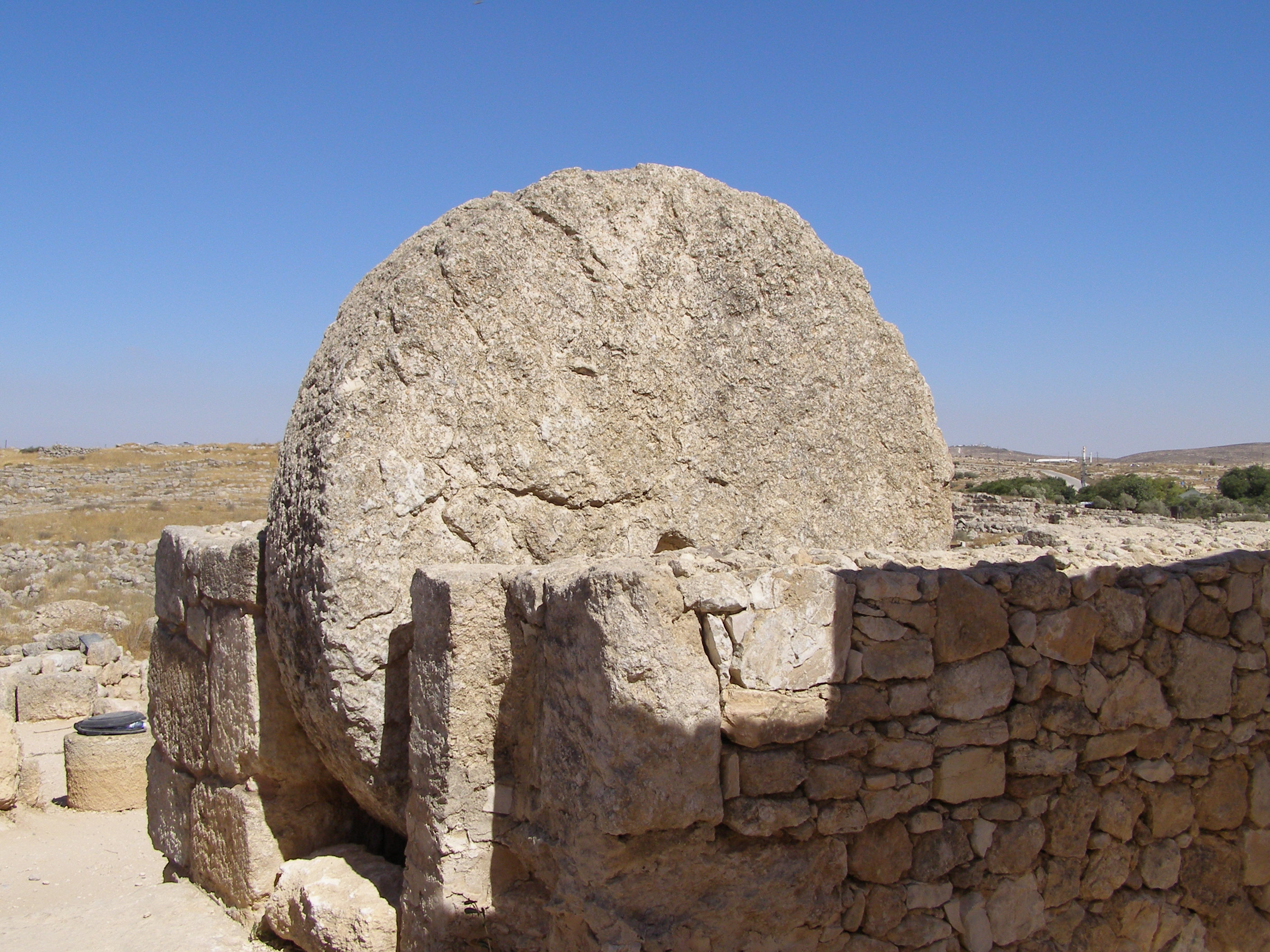
Burial stone at the entrance of the Susya synagogue

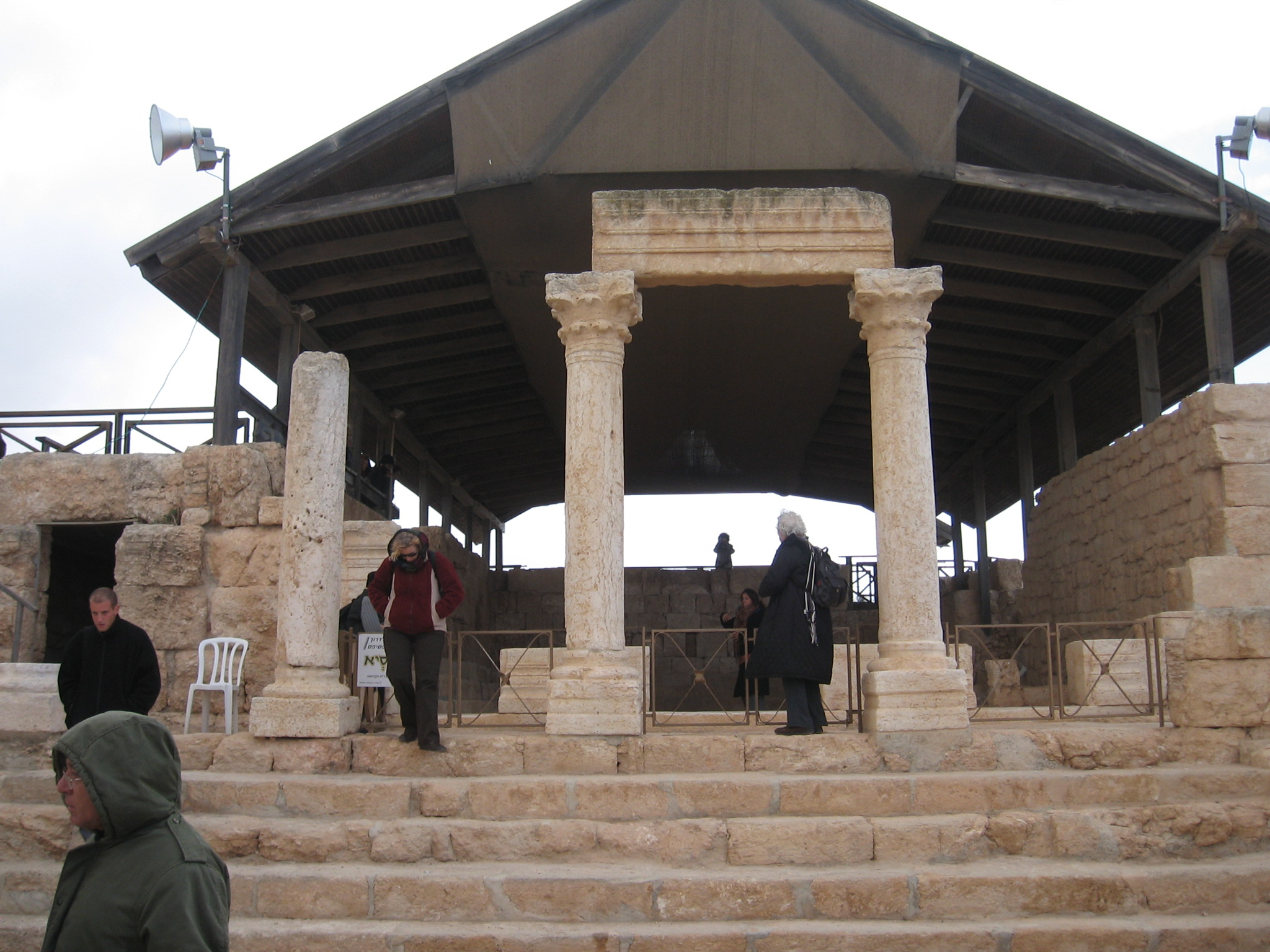
Susya synagogue

The excavated synagogue in Susya dates from the 4th to the 7th century CE and was in continuous use until the 9th century CE. According to Jodi Magness, the synagogue was built in the 4th - 5th centuries and continued in use for "at least" another two centuries. It is one of four of an architecturally unique group in the Southern Judean Hills. Only six synagogues have been identified in Judea as a whole; the lower number may be accounted for by a shift in the Jewish population from Judah to Galilee in the 2nd and 3rd centuries. The other three of this distinctive group are those of Eshtemoa, Horvat Maon, and 'Anim. Three outstanding characteristics of the Susya-Eshtemoa group, are their width, entrances at the short eastern wall, and the absence of columns to support the roof.

According to David Amit, the architectural design, particularly the eastern entrance and axis of prayer, which differ from the majority of Galilean synagogues, exhibits the ramifications of the earliest halakhic law conserved in southern Judea for generations after the destruction of the Temple. This was forgotten in Galilee, but in Judea there was a closer adherence to older traditions reflecting closer proximity to Jerusalem. The eastern orientation may be also related to the idea of dissuading heretics and Christians in the same area, who bowed to the east, in the belief that the Shekinah lay in that direction.

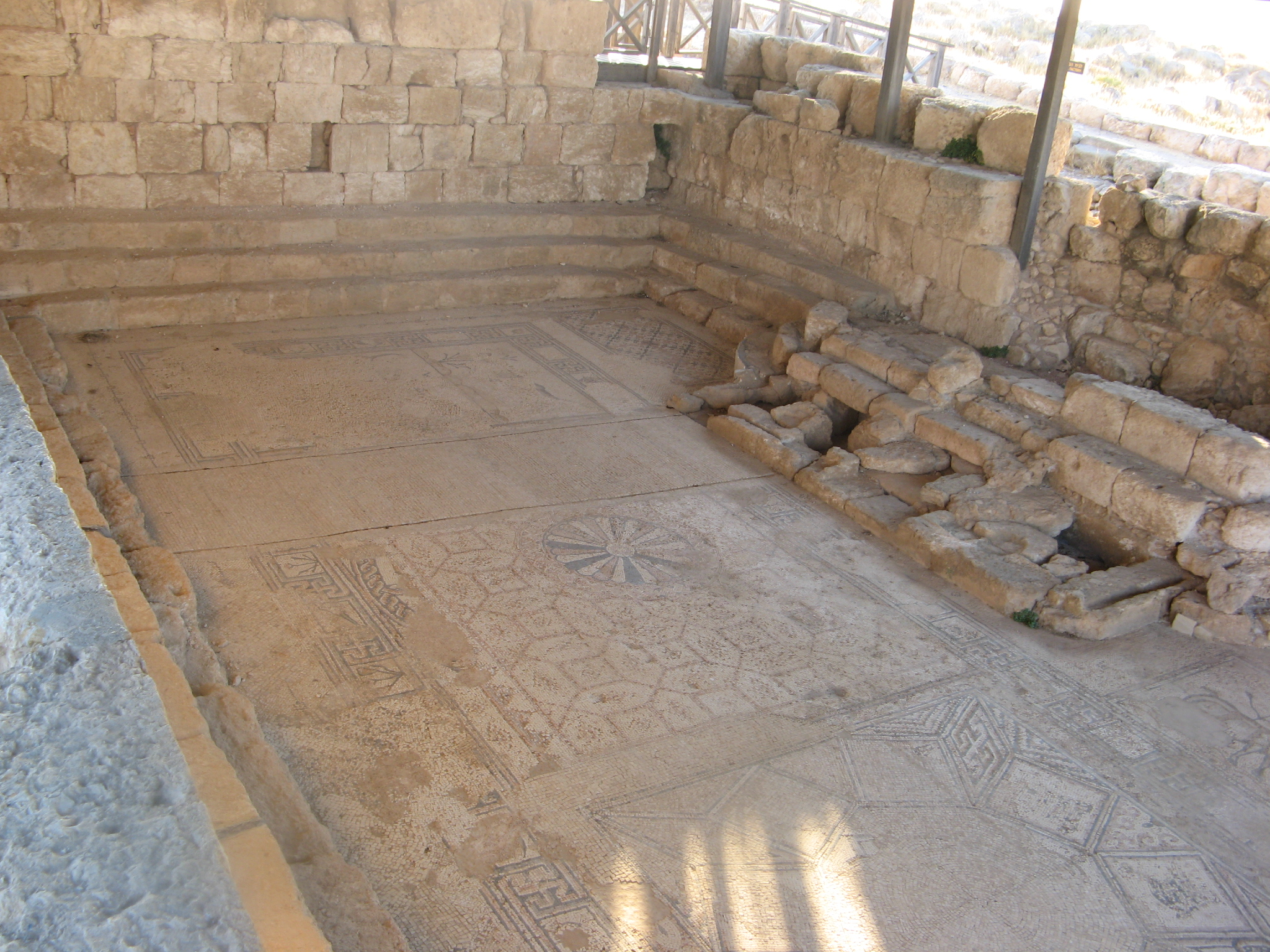
Interior of the synagogue

The synagogue was built as a broadhouse, rather than along basilica lines, measuring 9 by 16 metres (27 by 48 feet) built in well-wrought ashlar construction, with triple doorway façade in an eastward orientation, and the bimah and niche at the centre of the northern wall. There was a secondary bimah in the eastern section. Unlike other synagogues in Judea it had a gallery, made while reinforcing the western wall. East of the synagogue was an open courtyard surrounded on three sides by a roofed portico. The western side opened to the synagogue's narthex, and the floor of the narthex composed of coloured mosaics set in an interlaced pattern. This model was of short duration, yielding in the late Byzantine phase (6th/7th) to the basilica form, already elsewhere dominant in synagogue architecture.

In contrast to most Galilean synagogues with their façade and Torah shrine on the same Jerusalem-oriented wall, the Judean synagogue at Susya, (as well as Esthtemoa and Maon) has the niche on the northern Jerusalem-oriented wall and entrances on the east side wall. The synagogue floor of white tesserae has three mosaic panels, the eastern one a Torah Shrine, two menorahs, one on a screen relief showing two lamps suspended from a bar between the menorah's upper branches, (possibly because the Torah shrine was flanked by lampstands, serving the dual purpose of symbolizing a connection between the synagogue and the Temple while functioning as a spotlight for the bimah and giving light for scriptural readings). This was near the reverse mirroring of the menorah pattern in the mosaics, heightened the central significance of the Torah shrine in the hall a lulav, and an etrog with columns on each side. Next to the columns is a landscape with deer and rams. The central panel composed of geometric and floral patterns. A spoke-wheel design before the central bimah, has led Gutman to believe it is the remnant of a zodiac wheel. Zodiac mosaics are important witness to the time, since they were systematically suppressed by the Church, and, their frequent construction in Palestinian synagogue floors may be an index of 'the "inculturation" of non-Jewish imagery and its resulting Judaization'. The fragmentary state of the wheel mosaic is due to its replacement by a much cruder geometric pavement pattern, indicative of a desire to erase what later came to be thought of as objectionable imagery. The defacing of images may indicate changing Jewish attitudes to visual representations and graven images, perhaps influence by both Christian iconoclasm and Muslim aniconism.

A motif that probably represented Daniel in the lion's den, as in the mosaics discovered at Naaran near Jericho and Ein Samsam in the Golan was also tesselated, surviving only most fragmentarily. The figure, in an orans stance, flanked by lions, was scrubbed from the mosaics in line with later trends, in what Fine calls a "new aesthetic" at Khirbet Susiya, one that refurbished the designs to suppress iconographic forms thought by later generations to be objectionable. We can only reconstruct the allusion to Daniel from the remaining final Hebrew letters remaining, namely -el, אל.

Another unique feature is number of inscriptions. Four were laid in mosaics: two in Hebrew, attesting perhaps to its conservation as a spoken language in this region and two in Aramaic. Nineteen fragmentary inscriptions, some of which were in Greek, were etched into the marble of the building. From these dedicatory inscriptions the impression is given that the synagogue was run by donors rather than by priests (kōhen).

=== Early Islamic period village ===
After the Islamic conquest, the archaeological evidence appears to suggest that a new Muslim population immigrated to the South Hebron Hills and settled next to the Jewish population. According to Y. Mizrachi, the population changed in the seventh century and adopted Islam, as testified by unpublished Arabic inscriptions from the Synagogue, which was transformed into a mosque The village thrived until the 12th century.

The mosque in the courtyard of the former synagogue featured a mihrab in the southern wall, a second mihrab between two columns in the southern portico, and stone benches along the walls. Magness, assessing the evidence uncovered by the several archaeologists who dug at the site, which includes an inscription, dates the mosque to the reign of Caliph Al-Walid I, in the early eighth century.

=== Crusader/Ayyubid period village ===
By 1107, a Crusader named Gauterius Baffumeth was Lord of Hebron, and he donated the land of Sussia to the Hospitalers. In a document dated September 28, 1110, Baldwin I approved and confirmed this donation. As Baffumeth was Lord of nearby Hebron, Sussia is identified with Khirbet Susya. The dates suggest that the village was inhabited since the Arab period and has carried its name since then. The document calls Susya a casale (village), a testimony to its agriculture nature. By 1154, Susya was presumably still in the hands of the Hospitalers, as that year Baldwin III, with the consent of his mother, Melisende, confirmed the gift from Baffumeth.

In the 12th–13th centuries, Crusader troops were garrisoned at nearby Chermala (Khirbet al-Karmil) and, in their wake, a few families moved into the ruins to exploit the rich agricultural land.

According to local tradition, the niche on the northern wall of the synagogue-turned-mosque that was used as a mihrab, dates to Saladin's time.

=== Mamluk period: abandonment ===
Some researchers believe continuity of habitation lasted until the 13th century, while others date it to the 15th century.

=== 19th century explorers ===
In 1838, Edward Robinson and noted Susieh as a ruin located southwest of el-Khulil.

In his book The Land of Israel: A Journal of travel in Palestine, Henry Baker Tristram wrote "We rode rapidly on through Susieh, a town of ruins, on a grassy slope, quite as large as the others, and with an old basilica, but less troglodyte than Attir. Many fragments of columns strewed the ground, and in most respects it was a repetition of Rafat."

The site of Khirbet Susiyeh was first described in detail by V. Guérin in 1869, who first recognized its importance. Victor Guérin noted in 1863: "I see before me extend considerable ruins called Khirbet Sousieh. They are those of a city important bearing whose homes were generally well built, like attested by the vestiges that still remain, and possessed several buildings built in stone."

In 1883, the Palestine Exploration Fund's Survey of Western Palestine says "This ruin has also been at one time a place of importance...." In the Survey of Western Palestine, based on an observation in 1874 on the area of the southeastern slope of a hill west of Susya, H.H. Kitchener and Claude Conder noted that "This ruin has also been at one time a place of importance...." They thought the ruins were that of a Byzantine monastery. German accounts later stated that it was a remnant of an ancient church.

Maps of the 19th century that made the distinction sometimes depicted Susieh as a ruin and sometimes as a village. For example, the Palestine Exploration Fund map of 1878 and the Guérin map of 1881 showed it as a ruin, while the earlier Zimmermann map of 1850, the van de Velde maps of 1858 and 1865, and the Osborn map of 1859 showed it as a village.

=== British Mandate period village ===
The Bartholomew's quarter-inch map of Palestine by The Edinburgh Geographical Institute and the F.J. Salmon map of 1936 show Susya as ruins.

In 1937, the building to the north was identified by L. A. Meyer and A. Reifenberg as the site of a synagogue.

== Israeli-Palestinian conflict ==
=== Khirbet Susya (Palestinian village) ===
==== Origins and background ====
Khirbet Susya, called Susya al-Qadima ('Old Susya') was a village attached to the archaeological site at Khirbet Susiya.

In the early 19th century, many residents of the two big villages in the area of South Mount Hebron, Yatta and Dura, started to immigrate to ruins and caves in the area and became 'satellite villages' (daughters) to the mother town. Reasons for the expansion were lack of land for agriculture and construction in the mother towns, which resulted in high prices of land, rivalry between the mother-towns chamulas wishing to control more land and resources and being a security buffer which made it more difficult for robber gangs raid the mother villages. Caves are used by local as residences, storage space and sheepfold. The affiliation between the satellite villages and mother town remained. While some of the satellites became permanent villages with communities of hundreds, others remained temporary settlements which served the shepherds and fallāḥīn for several months every year. In 1981–82 it was estimated 100–120 families dwelt in caves permanently in the Southern Mount Hebron region while 750–850 families lived there temporarily.

Yaakov Havakook, a security officer who lived with the locals in the region for several years, writes that the community at Khirbet Susya was seasonal and didn't live in there year-round. Families of shepherds arrived after the first rain (October–November), stayed during the grazing season and left in April end or beginning of May. They were known for a special kind of cheese produced in their caves,

According to Rabbis for Human Rights, in 1948, the preexisting population was augmented by an influx of Palestinian refugees expelled during the 1948 Arab–Israeli War from the area of Ramat Arad, who purchased land in the area. Some refugees came from the Yatta's large khirba of al-Qaryatain. In 1982 an Israel settlement planner, Plia Albeck, examined the area of Susiya, the synagogue and the Palestinian village built on and around it, and finding it legally difficult to advance Jewish settlement, wrote:

"The [ancient] synagogue is located in an area that is known as the lands of Khirbet Susya, and around an Arab village between the ancient ruins. There is a formal registration on the land of Khirbet Susya with the Land Registry, according to which this land, amounting to approximately 3000 dunam [approximately 741 acres], is privately held by many Arab owners. Therefore the area proximal to the [ancient] synagogue is in all regards privately owned."

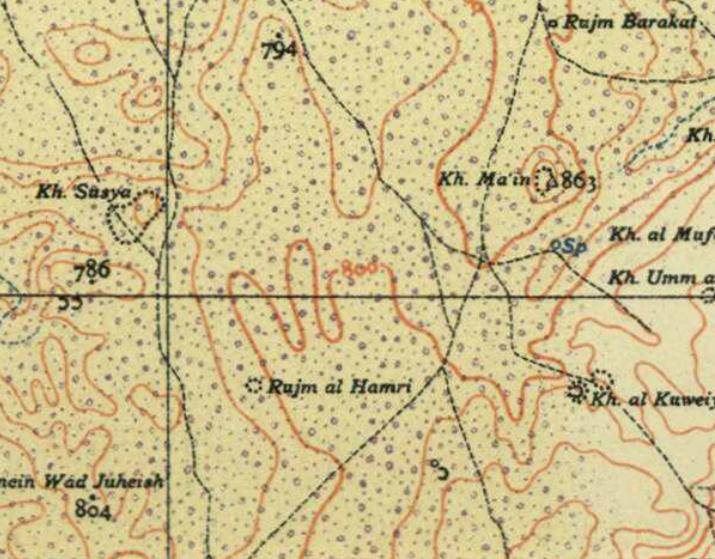
Map of Kh. Susya and Rujum al-Hamri from 1936

In June 1986, Israel expropriated the Palestinian village's residential ground for an archaeological site, evicting about 25 families. The expelled Palestinians settled in caves and tin shacks nearby, on their agricultural lands at a site now called Rujum al-Hamri, to restart their lives.

The Israeli government official stance on the matter says "There was no historic Palestinian village at the archaeological site there; that the village consists of only a few seasonal residences for a few families; and the land is necessary for the continuation of archaeological work." According to Regavim, an NGO which petitioned the Supreme Court to execute the demolition orders at Khirbet susya, the place was used as grazing area and olive agricalture seasonally before 1986. In a report, Regavim writes that travelers from the late 19th century report finding ruins (while nearby Semua was reported as inhabited), the British census from 1945 does not mention Susya and a survey from 1967, done after Six-Day War, refers to Khirbat Susya as ruins in contrast to nearby villages such as At-Tuwani, Yatta and more.

==== 2010s Bedouin settlement ====
According to The Washington Post, the modern Bedouin residential settlement that exists as of 2016 is the result of European aid; Spain donated the school, Germany provided solar panels, the water pumps were funded by Ireland, while Norway, Italy, Belgium, and other countries funded the children's playground. However, it was noted that the makeshift shelters have "more the feeling of a protest camp than a functioning Palestinian village. There are no streets, shops or mosques, and no permanent homes. There do not seem to be many people, either — giving some support to Regavim's claim that most of the residents live in the nearby Palestinian town of Yatta."

These days lived by harvesting olives, herding sheep, growing crops, and beekeeping.

==== Land ownership and master plan ====
A master plan was not approved and building permit were not given to Khirbet Susya because there was no sufficient proof of ownership as the documents lack geographic information and based on them, it was "not possible to make unambiguous claims of ownership over the land in question". The Jabor family supports a claim to land near Susya with Ottoman documents dated back to 1881 and the Nawaja family, who is originally from the Tel Arad area and moved to Susya in 1952, has documents as well. Their documents are problematic since the boundaries mentioned were described in terms of geography features which are hard to identify in the field.

In July 2015 it was published that, according to an internal document of findings by the Israeli Civil Administration officer Moshe Meiri, the claim to ownership of the land appears to be grounded on a valid Ottoman period title, dating back to 1881, in the possession of the Jabor family, This document has been known to Israeli officials since 1982. Though the precise extent of their land was not specified in the document, in an internal review of the case in 2015, Meiri established from the geographical features mentioned that the land covered territory now belonging to the Jabor and Nawaja families, and the villages on the basis of their Ottoman period documents claim an area that covers some 3,000 dunams (741 acres). In early 1986, before the first Israeli expulsion, the village was visited by U.S. consular officials, who recorded the occasion in photographs.

==== Additional expulsions ====
According to David Shulman, the second expulsion took place in 1990, when Rujum al-Hamri's inhabitants were loaded onto trucks by the IDF and dumped at the Zif Junction, 15 kilometers northwards a roadside at the edge of a desert. Most returned and rebuilt on a rocky escarpment within their traditional agricultural and grazing territory. Their wells taken, they were forced to buy water from nearby Yatta. Palestinian residents (2012) pay 25 NIS per cubic meter water brought in by tanks, which is 5 times the cost to the nearby Israeli settlement. Net consumption, at 28 litres per diem, is less than half what Palestinians consume (70 lpd) and less than the recommended WHO level. Israel sheep-herding settlers expanded their unfenced land use at Mitzpe Yair, the "Dahlia Farm" a term used by Susiya Palestinians to refer to the farm run by the widow of Yair Har-Sinai. According to B'tselem, by 2010 settlers were cultivating roughly 40 hectares, about 15% of the land area to which they deny access to the traditional Palestinian users of that area. Since 2000 Jewish settlers in Susya have denied Palestinians access to 10 cisterns in the area, or according to more recent accounts, 23, and try to block their access to others. Soil at Susya, with a market value of NIS 2,000 per truckload, is also taken from lands belonging to the village of Yatta.

The third expulsion occurred in June 2001, when settler civilians and soldiers drove the Palestinians of Susya out, without warning, with, reportedly violent arrests and beatings. On 3 July 2001, the Israeli army demolished dozens of homes in Susya and contiguous Palestinian villages, and bulldozed their cisterns, many ancient, built for gathering rainwater, and then filling them with gravel and cement to hinder their reuse. Donated solar panels were also destroyed, livestock killed, and agricultural land razed.. On Sept 26 of the same year, by an order of the Israeli Supreme Court, these structures were ordered to be destroyed and the land returned to the Palestinians. Settlers and the IDF prevented the villagers from reclaiming their land, some 750 acres. The villagers made an appeal to the same court to be allowed to reclaim their lands and live without harassment. Some 93 events of settler violence were listed. The settlers made a counter-appeal, and one family that had managed to return to its land suffered a third eviction.

In 2002 an Israeli outpost was established without the necessary building permit. OCHA reports that as of 2012 the Israeli Civil Administration has imposed no demolitions on this outpost, which is connected to Israel's water and electricity networks, and cites the example as putative evidence that Israeli policy is discriminating between the two communities.

In 2006, structures without a permit were demolished illegally on the orders of a low-ranking officer, and the demolition was strongly criticized 3 years later by the High Court of Israel. At around 11 pm on the 22 July 2007 Ezra Nawi caught sight of settlers laying irrigation pipes on another slice of Palestinian land. He called the Israeli police at Kiryat Arba to put an end to the usurpation, and, a few minutes later, dozens of settlers came, threw rocks at his car and threatened to kill him. The move to appropriate the land was blocked. In September 2008 the Israeli army informed the Palestinians at Susya that a further 150 dunums (15 hectares), where 13 remaining rainwater cisterns are located, would be a "closed military area" to which they were denied access. Amnesty International described the resultant contrast between the Palestinian and Jewish Susyas as follows:

"in the nearby Israeli settlement of Sussia, whose very existence is unlawful under international law, the Israeli settlers have ample water supplies. They have a swimming pool and their lush irrigated vineyards, herb farms and lawns – verdant even at the height of the dry season – stand in stark contrast to the parched and arid Palestinian villages on their doorstep."

According to Shulman, for some decades they were subject, to many violent attacks, and settler recourse to both civil and military courts, to drive them out. The BBC broadcast film of settler youths beating an old woman and her family with cudgels to drive them away from their land, in 2008. Local villages, like Palestinian Susya, have been losing land, and being cut off from each other, as the nearby settlements of Carmel, Maon, Susya and Beit Yatir began to be built and developed, and illegal outposts established. Shulman described the reality he observed in 2008:

Susya: where thirteen impoverished families are clinging tenaciously, but probably hopelessly, to the dry hilltop and the few fields that are all that remain of their vast ancestral lands.

According to B'tselem, the Palestinians that remain in the area live in tents on a small rocky hill between the settlement and the archaeological park which is located within walking distance. According to Amnesty International, ten caves inhabited by Susya Palestinian families were blown up by the IDF in 1996, and some 113 tents were destroyed in 1998. Amnesty International also reports that official documents asking them to leave the area address them generically as 'intruders' (polesh/intruder). Most of the rain-catching water cisterns used by the local Palestinian farmers of Susya were demolished by the Israeli army in 1999 and 2001. A local Susya resident told Amnesty International,

Water is life; without water we can't live; not us, not the animals, or the plants. Before we had some water, but after the army destroyed everything we have to bring water from far away; it's very difficult and expensive. They make our life very difficult, to make us leave.

While the Israeli settlement has mains power and piped water from Israel, the Palestinians depend on solar panels and wind turbine energy made possible by a Palestinian/Israeli NGO – Comet - and on wells. This project has been shortlisted for the BBC World Challenge which highlighted the involvement of two Israeli physicists, Elad Orian and Noam Dotan. According to David Hirst, the inhabitants of Susya, are faced with a catch-22. If they comply with the law they cannot build cisterns and collect even the rainwater. But if they fail to work their lands, they lose it anyway. One small enclave that remains for a Bedouin pastoralist's family suffers from further encroachment, with one settler, according to Shulman, managing to wrest 95% of the family's land, and still intent on entering the remainder.

In a ruling delivered in December 2013, the Israel High Court of Justice accepted that Yatta Palestinians had shown their legal attachment to a stretch of land between Susya and the illegal settlement of Mitzpe Yair, but requested them to withdraw their petition against the settlers who are alleged to have illegally seized these lands. The subject of a petition concerns 300 dunams of agricultural land, and a further 900 dunams of pasture of which, the Palestinians argue, they were forced by violent attacks from using for agriculture and herding. The court held that the proper option open to the Palestinians was recourse to a civil legal action. Of the 120 complaints registered with Israeli police in Hebron by Palestinians of Susya, regarding alleged attacks, threats, incursions, and property damage wrought by settlers down to 2013, upwards of 95% have been dismissed, without charges being laid.

==== Legal fight & demolition orders ====
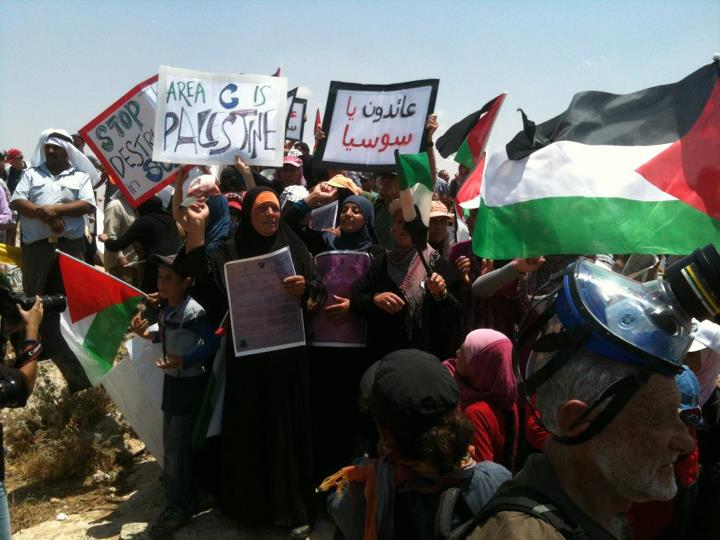
A Palestinian demonstration against the demolition of the village of Susya

After 1985, when the population was expelled, attempts by the Palestinian of Susya to rebuild their village have been razed by Israel four times, in 1991, 1997 and twice in 2001. Since it is classified within Area C of the West Bank, it lies under Israeli military occupation and control. Though they own much of the land, Israel denies building permits to Susya's residents and therefore they build without permission from Israeli authorities. The master plan for Susya was denied by the Israeli Civil Administration as opposed to the Israeli settlement of Susya, and Palestinians are required to obtain permits from the Israeli Civil Administration.

In 2008 the Supreme Court turned down the villagers' request for a staying order on planned demolition. According to Shulman, the State attorney claimed that the Palestinians of Susya were a security threat to the settlers, and had to be moved. When asked by the judges where they would move to, the State replied:'We don't know. They are unfortunates, miskenim.'.

In 2011, Israel executed 4 waves of demolition, affecting 41 structures, including 31 residential tents or shacks and two water cisterns. As a result, 37 people, including 20 children, were displaced and a further 70 affected. On 24 November 2011 bulldozers razed two tents where the Mughnem family dwells on their own land in Susya.

The Jewish settlers of Susya and the Israeli pro-settler association NGO Regavim petitioned the High Court to demolish Palestinian Susya, defining the villagers as 'trespassers' living in 'illegal outposts', terms usually applied to illegal Jewish outposts on the West Bank.

On 14 June an Israeli court issued 6 demolition orders covering 50 buildings including tent dwellings, ramshackle huts, sheep pens, latrines, water cisterns, a wind-and-sun powered turbine, and the German-funded solar panels in most of the Palestinian village of Susya. Over 500 people from Tel Aviv, Beer Sheva, and Jerusalem came to mount a peaceful protest on 22 June.

On 26 June 2013, the Israeli Civil Administration, raided Palestinian Susya and handed out 40 demolition orders for many structures, tents, hothouses, a water well and a solar panel, established on humanitarian grounds by the European Union. Nearby Israeli settlers built two additional and unauthorized houses in the Mitzpeh Avigayil outpost, without interference.

A local Palestinian declared to the Hebrew press:

They’re calling our village an illegal outpost. These lands are ours from before there was a State of Israel. My father is older than your state—and I am an illegal alien on my own land. I ask where is justice? Your courts distinguish between the settler and the Palestinian…We’re surrounded by illegal outposts [built by settlers] that have everything—infrastructures of water and electricity— despite the fact that these settlements are illegal even under Israeli law. And now you want to expel this old man from his home once again? To expel all of us who own these lands, who have lived on them for generations in this space that is ours, which is all we know?

In an exchange in the Knesset with Joint List Member Dov Khenin, who noted that Plia Albeck, a pro-settler former government official had admitted that in 1982 that Susya was surrounded by an Arab village, and that the land is registered at the Israeli Lands Authority as under private Arab title, a Rabbi from the Jewish Home Party, Deputy Defense Minister and new head of Israel's Civil Administration, Eli Ben Dahan, publicly denied that Susya exists, asserting that attempts to protect the village were a ploy by leftists to take over Area C.

"There has never been an Arab village called Susya," Ben Dahan said, calling the village "a ploy by leftist organizations to take over Area C [of the West Bank]".

On 24 August, a further demolition took place. On 29 August 2012 the IDF destroyed a sheepfold and two tents, one a dwelling and the other for storage, donated to the villagers of Palestinian Susya by the United Nations' Office for the Coordination of Humanitarian Affairs.

In May 2015, the Israel High Court approved the demolition of Palestinian Susya. The implementation of the plan was expected to leave 450 villagers homeless. A delegation of diplomats from 28 European countries visited Susya in June and urged Israel not to evict its 300 Palestinian residents, a move that would endanger in their view the two-state solution.

==== International involvement ====
Israeli plans to demolish the Palestinian village have become an international cause célèbre. According to Amira Hass, before fifteen senior EU diplomats visiting the area on 8 August 2012, Susya villager Nasser Nawaja'a complained that "(t)here are in this village octogenarians who are older than the State of Israel . . . How can they be told that their residence here is illegal?" The EU declared at the time it does not expect that the demolition order will be executed. An Israeli officer objected to this narrative, saying, "It would be absolutely false to present these people [the villagers] as having lived there since the time of Noah's Ark and suddenly the big bad Israelis come and destroy the place. We are a bit sad that some of the Europeans and the Americans are falling into that trap."

In July the US State Department urged Israel to refrain from any demolitions and asked it to seek a peaceful resolution with villagers, and the European Union issued a strongly worded admonition urging Israel to abandon plans for the "forced transfer of population and demolition of Palestinian housing and infrastructure" in Khirbet Susiya.

The EU funded the construction of buildings in Area C which is under interim Israeli jurisdiction, built without permits and which cost tens of millions of Euros. EU documents show the intention is to "pave the way for development and more authority of the PA over Area C". A spokesman said it was justified on humanitarian grounds while Ari Briggs, International Director of Regavim, said the project is a 'Trojan horse' with political aims. As of 2016 the existing infrastructure is the result of European aid: Spain donated the school, Germany provided solar panels; the water pumps were funded by Ireland, while Norway, Italy Belgium and other countries funded the children's playground, however, the makeshift shelters have "more the feeling of a protest camp than a functioning Palestinian village.'The author claims that the settler NGO Regavim's assertion that the people of Susya live in Yatta on the basis of the fact that Susya has 'no streets, shops or mosques, and no permanent homes. There do not seem to be many people, either."

=== Susya (Israeli settlement) ===
In 1982 the Israeli government together with the World Zionist Organization furnished a plan to establish a settlement on the site, part of 8 new settlements envisioned for the area, with funding of 20 million shekels providing for between 50 and 60 Jewish families.

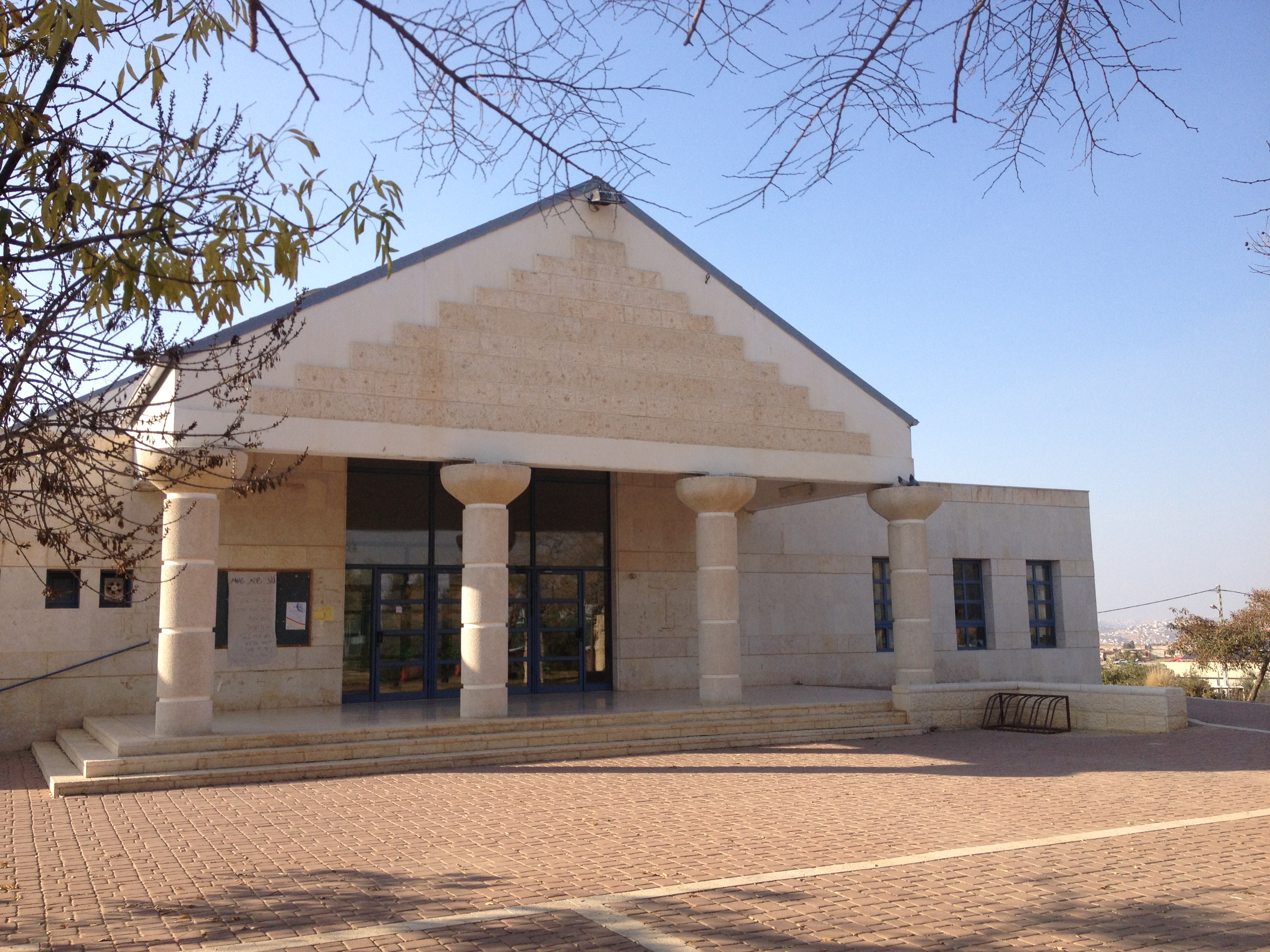
Susya main synagogue

Work on the Israeli settlement of Susya began from May through to September in the following year. on 1,800 dunams of land. A major expansion began on 18 September 1999, when its boundaries expanded northwards and eastwards, with the Palestinian Shreiteh family allegedly losing roughly 150 more dunams.

In 2008, the largest and most advanced goat pen and dairy was inaugurated at Susya with an investment of 3.5 million ILS. It can contain 1500 goats and milk 48 of them at a time. By Regavim's own calculations, by 2015, 23 Jewish/Israeli homes have been built on private Palestinian property in Susya.

Former Christian Afrikaners who have converted to Judaism have settled in Susya, which has reportedly developed into one of the strongholds for South African converts who perform aliyah.

=== Israeli Settler Violence ===
On 7 June 1991, Palestinians and an Israeli settler Baruch Yellin had a dispute over grazing rights. A Gush Emunim spokesman said Yellin shot one Palestinian dead after he had been attacked with sticks by a Palestinian. According to the Palestinian eyewitnesses, Jabar Hawad al-Nawajah was told not to graze near the settlement, and then Yellin rode off, returned with a M-16 rifle and shot a dozen of his sheep. A relative of the shepherd, Mahmoud al-Nawajah, came over to the scene and was then shot in the stomach and died. The full circumstances were never clarified.

On 23 March 1993, Musa Suliman Abu Sabha a Palestinian was arrested outside Susya by two guards, Moshe Deutsch and Yair Har-Sinai, on suspicion that he was planning an attack on Jews. Taken for questioning, he stabbed in the shoulder or back one of the guards, Moshe Deutsch, while the two were in a car, and, wrestled to the ground, was bound hand and foot. Another settler from nearby Susya, Yoram Shkolnik shot him eight times, killing him. According to the IDF a grenade was found on the body while other reports claimed the grenade was removed from him prior to the shooting. In 2001, Yair Har-Sinai was killed in a brawl with local Palestinians. A Palestinian, Jihad Najar, was convicted of murder and received a sentence of life imprisonment. The IDF then evicted the 300 Palestinians in the area, demolishing some of their makeshift homes. They have sought redress in an Israeli court, which ruled that illegal demolitions had taken place, the state had failed to provide procedures to enable the plaintiffs to obtain building permits, and was creating a situation in which elementary human rights to life were being denied.

Jewish residents of Susya have harassed local Palestinians, destroyed their property, and hindered them from gathering their crops from olive groves. In 2009 Yaakov Teitel, was indicted for the 2007 murder of a Palestinian shepherd from Susya.

=== Archaeological park ===
In 1986, the locals were evicted from their homes which became an archaeological park.

In 2011, an illegal Israeli settler outpost with 3 wooden huts was set up on the archaeological site.

In 2012, the park was declared national heritage site. Palestinians from Susiya have tried to purchase an admission ticket to the now archaeological Susya a handful of times. They say they have been denied entry each time.

According to the Jerusalem Post, a fire broke out and was extinguished by five firefighters before damaging the inside of the archaeological park in July 2020.

== See also ==
- Ancient synagogues in the Palestine region - covers entire Palestine region/Land of Israel
  - Ancient synagogues in Israel - covers the modern State of Israel
- Ezra Nawi (born 1952), Israeli Jewish left-wing human rights activist, active among the Bedouin of the South Hebron Hills

== Bibliography ==
- Amit, David (1998). Urman, Dan; Flesher, Paul Virgil McCracken (eds.). Architectural plans of Synagogues in the Southern Judean Hills and the 'Halakah'. Studia Post Biblica, Volume 47. Brill. p. 132. ISBN 9789004112544.
- Conder, C.R.; Kitchener, H.H. (1883). The Survey of Western Palestine: Memoirs of the Topography, Orography, Hydrography, and Archaeology. Vol. 3. London: Committee of the Palestine Exploration Fund.
- Guérin, V. (1869). Description Géographique Historique et Archéologique de la Palestine (in French). Vol. 1: Judee, pt. 3. Paris: L'Imprimerie Nationale.
- Negev, Avraham; Gibson, Shimon, eds. (2001). Susiya (Khirbet). New York and London: Continuum. pp. 482–484. ISBN 0-8264-1316-1. (No access to text on Google Books as of 2021).
- Magness, Jodi (2003). The Archaeology of the Early Islamic Settlement in Palestine. Vol. 1. Eisenbrauns. pp. 99–104. ISBN 9781575060705.
- Palmer, E.H. (1881). The Survey of Western Palestine: Arabic and English Name Lists Collected During the Survey by Lieutenants Conder and Kitchener, R. E. Transliterated and Explained by E.H. Palmer. Committee of the Palestine Exploration Fund. (p. 433)
- Robinson, E.; Smith, E. (1841). Biblical Researches in Palestine, Mount Sinai and Arabia Petraea: A Journal of Travels in the year 1838. Vol. 2. Boston: Crocker & Brewster. (Robinson and Smith, 1841, vol 2, pp. 194–5, 627
- Röhricht, R. (1887). "Studien zur mittelalterlichen Geographie und Topographie Syriens". Zeitschrift des Deutschen Palästina-Vereins. 10: 195–344.
- Röhricht, R. (1893). (RRH) Regesta regni Hierosolymitani (MXCVII-MCCXCI) (in Latin). Berlin: Libraria Academica Wageriana. )
- Safrai, Zeev (1998). The Missing Century: Palestine in the fifth century: growth and decline. Palaestina antiqua, Vol. 9. Peeters Publishers. ISBN 9789068319859.
- Shalem, Nathan, The desert of Juda [In Hebrew], 1967–8, Israel.
- Tristram, H.B. (1865). Land of Israel, A Journal of travel in Palestine, undertaken with special reference to its physical character. London: Society for Promoting Christian Knowledge.
- Werlin, Steven H. (2015). Ancient Synagogues of Southern Palestine, 300–800 C.E.: Living on the Edge. The Brill Reference Library of Judaism. pp. 136–181. ISBN 9789004298408.
