= Hamdan Ballal =

Palestinian filmmaker (born 1989)

- حمدان بلال
- Ballal in 2025
- Born: Hamdan Ballal Al-Huraini; 1989 (age 36–37); Susya, Hebron Governorate, Palestine
- Occupation: Filmmaker
- Organization: B'Tselem

Hamdan Ballal Al-Huraini (Arabic: حمدان بلال الهريني, romanized: Ḥamdān Ballāl al-Huraynī; born 1989) is a Palestinian filmmaker, photographer, agriculturalist, and human rights activist from Susya in the South Hebron Hills of the occupied West Bank. He gained international recognition as co-director of the Academy Award-winning documentary No Other Land (2024), which chronicles Israeli settler violence and displacement campaigns against Palestinian communities in Masafer Yatta between 2019 and 2023.

Ballal's activism includes documenting occupation-related human rights abuses as a volunteer field researcher for B'Tselem and co-founding the "Humans of Masafer Yatta" storytelling project. In March 2025, he was assaulted by Israeli settlers at his home in Susya and subsequently detained by the Israel Defense Forces, an incident that drew global attention amid escalating tensions following the film's Oscar win.

== Early life and family ==
Ballal was born in 1989 in Susya, a Palestinian village in the South Hebron Hills of the West Bank. He is married and has one son.

== Career ==
Ballal has worked as a farmer, photographer, activist, and researcher. In addition to filmmaking, he is a member of the "Humans of Masafer Yatta" initiative, which highlights personal stories from the region. He also volunteers as a field researcher for human rights organizations, including B'Tselem, documenting incidents related to the Israeli occupation.

Ballal co-directed the 2024 documentary film No Other Land alongside Basel Adra, Yuval Abraham, and Rachel Szor. The film examines Israeli settlement expansion and violence in the West Bank, earning critical acclaim. It won the Academy Award for Best Documentary Feature at the 97th Academy Awards, as well as the Panorama Audience Award and the Berlinale Documentary Award at the 74th Berlin International Film Festival. No Other Land is Ballal's first film, produced over five years in collaboration with his co-directors.

== Post-Oscars assault and detention ==
Yuval Abraham יובל אברהם
(@yuval_abraham)
tweeted:

A group of settlers just lynched Hamdan Ballal, co director of our film no other land. They beat him and he has injuries in his head and stomach, bleeding. Soldiers invaded the ambulance he called, and took him. No sign of him since.

24 March 2025

On 24 March 2025, Ballal was assaulted by Israeli settlers who attacked his home in Susya. According to reports, 10–20 masked settlers, armed with sticks, stones, and in some cases firearms and knives, targeted Ballal and activists from the Center for Jewish Nonviolence. The assailants, accompanied by unidentified IDF soldiers, entered Susya and proceeded directly to Ballal's residence, vandalizing property, smashing windows, and slashing vehicle tires. The IDF soldiers assisted the settlers in assaulting Ballal, striking him in the head with the butts of their rifles and threatening to kill him. Witnesses stated that although Israeli police arrived at the scene, they did not intervene.

The attack occurred as villagers were breaking their daily Ramadan fast. Ballal sustained head injuries and was receiving treatment in an ambulance when IDF soldiers forcibly removed, blindfolded, and detained him at a military base. Israeli authorities confirmed his detention but did not announce any immediate charges. In an official statement regarding the arrest, the IDF alleged that "terrorists began hurling rocks at the security forces," which led to the detention of "three Palestinians suspected of hurling rocks at them along with one Israeli" who participated in "mutual rock-hurling between Palestinians and Israelis".

After the attack, Ballal's co-director Yuval Abraham posted on X that there had been "no sign" of Ballal since the incident. On 25 March 2025, after spending a night detained at an IDF base—where, according to his lawyer, he received minimal medical care—Ballal was released by Israeli police. He stated that Israeli soldiers had beaten him again during his detention at the base.

Residents of Susya reported an escalation in settler violence following the film's Oscar win, suggesting retaliation for its success. After his release, Ballal recounted: "I heard the voices of the soldiers, they were laughing about me … I heard 'Oscar' but I didn't speak Hebrew."

Following his detention, the European Film Academy called for Ballal's release, while the Academy of Motion Picture Arts and Sciences—having recently awarded Ballal an Oscar—remained silent despite calls from its members. On 27 March 2025, the Academy issued a statement reaffirming its commitment to artistic freedom, declaring, "We condemn the harming or suppression of artists for their work or their viewpoints," though it did not mention Ballal by name. The following day, over 500 Academy members signed an open letter criticizing the organization for failing to publicly support Ballal after his arrest. On 29 March 2025, the Academy apologized for not acknowledging Ballal or his film by name and to all artists who felt unsupported by its previous statement. It also condemned "violence of this kind anywhere in the world," adding, "We abhor the suppression of free speech under any circumstances."

== Awards ==
Year	Work	Award	Category	Result	Notes	Ref.
2024	No Other Land	International Documentary Association	Best Director	Won	Shared with Basel Adra, Rachel Szor, and Yuval Abraham.	
2024	No Other Land	74th Berlin International Film Festival	Panorama Audience Award	Won	Shared with Basel Adra, Rachel Szor, and Yuval Abraham.	
2024	No Other Land	74th Berlin International Film Festival	Berlinale Documentary Award	Won	Shared with Basel Adra, Rachel Szor, and Yuval Abraham.	
2025	No Other Land	97th Academy Awards	Best Documentary Feature	Won	Shared with Basel Adra, Rachel Szor, and Yuval Abraham.	
2025	No Other Land	78th British Academy Film Awards	Best Documentary	Won	Shared with Basel Adra, Rachel Szor, and Yuval Abraham.	

== See also ==
- Israeli settler violence
- Israeli–Palestinian conflict
