= Avraham Negev =

Israeli archaeologist

Avraham Negev (Hebrew: אברהם נגב; 1923–2004) was an Israeli archaeologist.

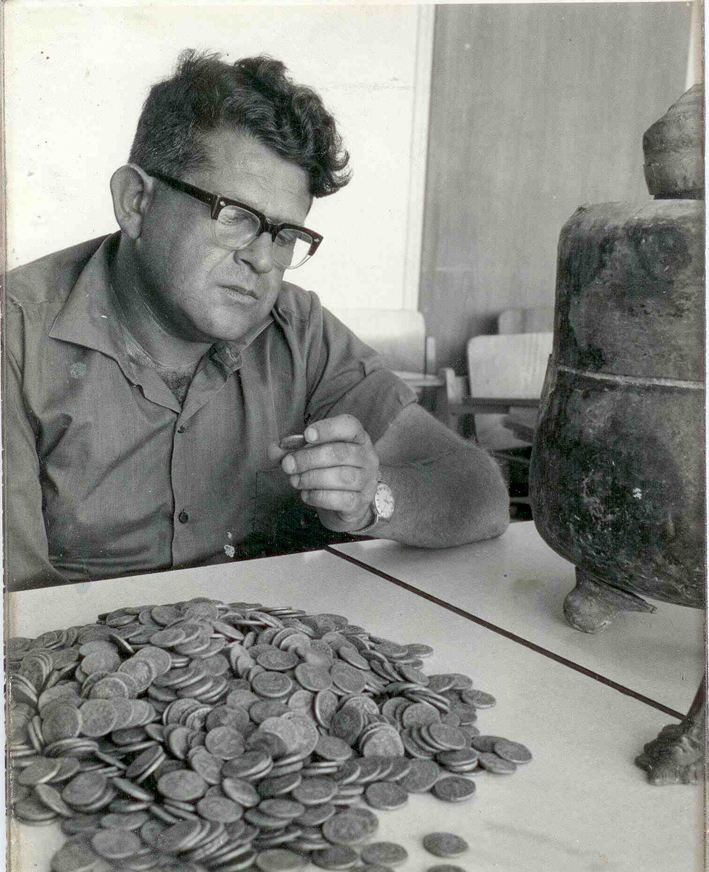

== Life ==
Negev, surname at birth Eisenberg, was born in the town of Pinsk in Poland, today in Belarus.

He was a commander in the Haganah police force, and lost his right hand in 1947.

== Career ==
Negev has excavated Nabataean sites in the Negev, at Caesarea Maritima (1961–62), and Susiya (1984–85), which he associated with biblical Carmel.

Researching the Nabataean culture was difficult, not least because major sites lay outside his reach due to the Arab–Israeli conflict, such as Petra in Jordan, Hegra (Mada'in Salih) in Saudi Arabia, and Seeia in Syria (Sî' near Kanatha in Jebel Druze). His excavations in the Negev desert included the Nabataean caravan stops of Oboda (Avdat, 1958–61 and 1975–77), Mampsis (1965–67), and Elusa (1973 and 1979–80). This work allowed Avraham Negev to gain in-depth knowledge of the Nabataean civilisation and particularly of its trade network in the Negev region.

Negev worked as a professor of archaeology at the Hebrew University of Jerusalem (HUJI) between 1964 and 1990.

== Published work ==
Negev was the editor of the Archaeological Encyclopedia of the Holy Land, which was first published in 1972.
