= Mitzpe Yair =

- Location within the Southern West Bank
- Coordinates: 31°23′00″N 35°08′04″E
- Country: Palestine
- District: Judea and Samaria Area
- Council: Har Hebron
- Region: West Bank
- Founded: October 1998
- Founder: Meir Am-Shalem

Mitzpe Yair (Hebrew: מצפה יאיר, lit. 'Yair Lookout') is an unauthorized Israeli settlement in the Israeli-occupied West Bank. Located two kilometres south-east of the settlement of Susya, it falls under the jurisdiction of Har Hebron Regional Council. It consists of 15 prefabricated structures, and is home for several families.

The international community considers Israeli settlements in the West Bank illegal under international law, though the Israeli government disputes this. However, even the Israeli government considers outposts like Mitzpe Yair illegal.

== History ==
Mitzpe Yair was established by Meir Am-Shalem in October 1998, and, according to Gideon Levy, was a price tag operation set up as Magen David Farm in retribution for the murder of a Susya settler, Yair Har-Sinai, after whom it was subsequently renamed.

== Legal status ==
Mitzpe Yair is an unauthorized settlement that is regarded as illegal by the Israeli regional administration. In 2007 Peace Now revealed that a police superintendent was residing there despite its illegal status. The officer was ordered to evacuate his house by July that year.

The international community considers all Israeli settlements in the West Bank illegal under international law, but the Israeli government disputes this in regard to those settlements who do have state authorization.

A vineyard in a wadi, planted on privately owned Palestinian land, and run by Elad Movshoviz, produces 7,000 bottles per annum. A legal case on the ownership of the area was, as of 2012, pending before the Israeli High Court of Justice.
