= Susya (Israeli settlement) =

Israeli settlement in the West Bank

Susya: סוסיא (Hebrew)
- Community settlement
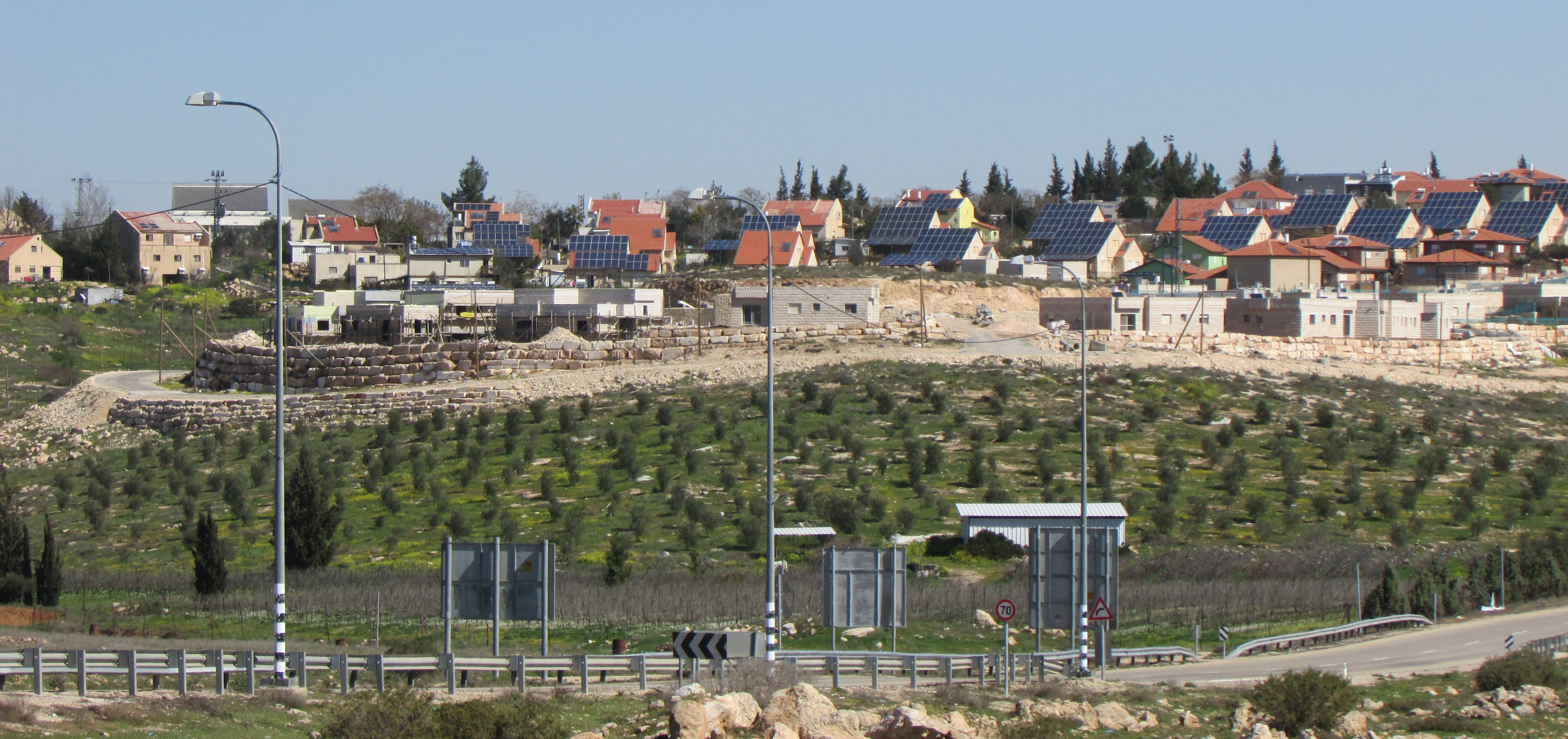
- View of Susya

- Location within the Southern West Bank Location within the West Bank
- Coordinates: 31°23′31″N 35°6′44″E
- Country: Palestine
- District: Judea and Samaria Area
- Council: Har Hevron
- Region: West Bank
- Affiliation: Amana
- Founded: 1983; 43 years ago
- Population (2024): 1,605
- Website: susya.net

Susya (Hebrew: סוסיא) is a religious community Israeli settlement in the West Bank. Located near the archaeological site of Susya, it falls under the jurisdiction of Har Hevron Regional Council. In 2024, it had a population of 1,605.

The international community considers Israeli settlements in the West Bank illegal under international law, but the Israeli government disputes this.

== History ==
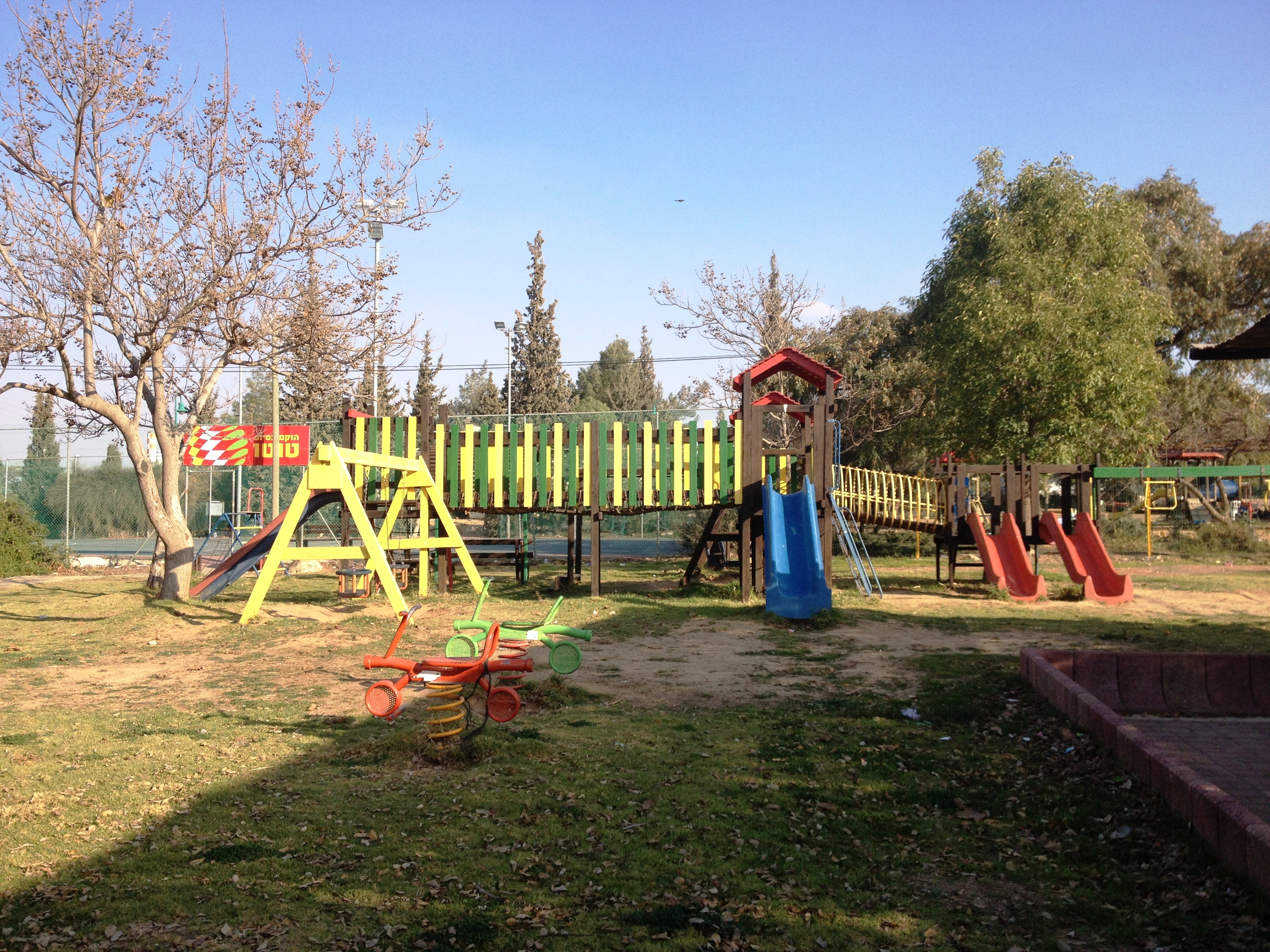
Playground in Susya

The Palestinian settlement of Susya contained an archaeological site with the same name. After the area was occupied by Israel, the Institute of Archaeology at Hebrew University of Jerusalem began excavating at Susya in 1971. The Israeli settlement of Susya was established between May and September 1983, on 1,800 dunams of land. In the view of anthropologist Maya Wind, "In an attempt to erase the contemporary Palestinian village, they named the Jewish settlement Susya and declared that they were "reclaiming" Jewish presence on the land."

In 1985, the Susya Tourism and Education Center was established which offers tours and activities in the nearby archaeological site. The following year, the Israeli Civil Administration officially recognitioned Susya as an archaeological site; the Palestinian inhabitants were expelled and some of their expropriated land was given to the Israeli settlement.

On 23 March 1993, Musa Suliman Abu Sabha, a Palestinian was arrested outside Susiya by two guards, Moshe Deutsch and Yair Har-Sinai, because they suspected he was planning an attack on Jews. Taken for questioning, he stabbed in the shoulder or back one of the guards, Moshe Deutsch, while the two were in a car, and, wrestled to the ground, was bound hand and foot. Another settler from nearby Maal Hever, Yoram Shkolnik shot him eight times, killing him. According to the Israel Defense Forces (IDF), he was found bearing a grenade, although the Baltimore Sun attributed assertions that, "the grenade had previously been removed from him" to unspecified "other sources. Shkolnik was arrested and served seven and a half years in prison for murder.

Susya was expanded in late 1999 by installing 10 caravans on 4 dunams of land belonging to a Palestinian family, the Shreiteh.

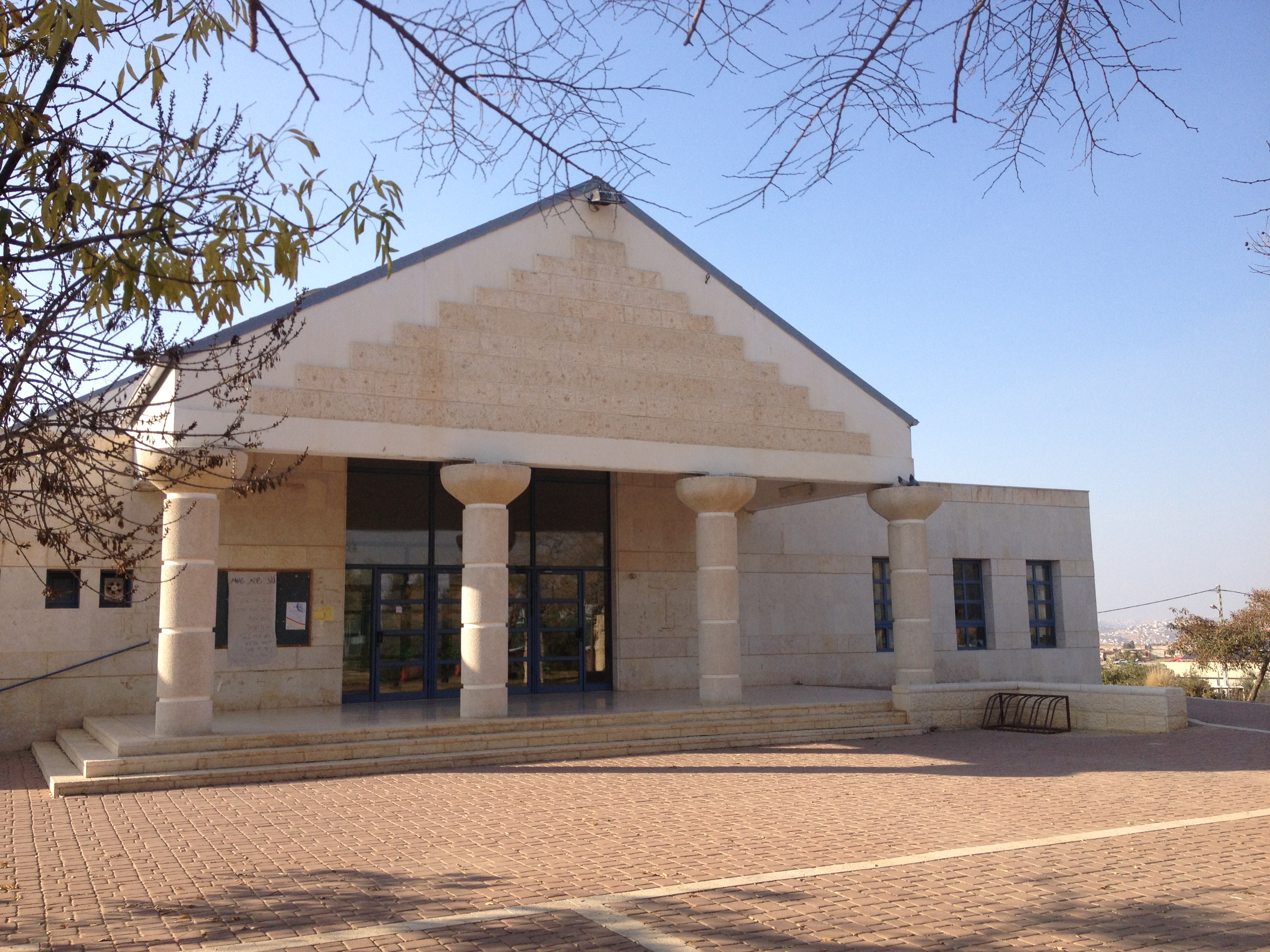
Susya Synagogue

On 2 July 2001, the body of Yair Har-Sinai, a Jewish shepherd of 19 years from Susya who advocated pacifism was found shot in the head and chest by Muhammad Noor from nearby Khirbet Susya.

On October 16 2005, one of three victims of the Al-Aqsa Martyrs' Brigades shooting attack at Gush Etzion, a fifteen-year-old boy named Oz Ben-Meir, from Ma'on is buried in the Susya cemetery in the southeastern portion of the settlement across Road 317 from the main housing section of this settlement. A friend and he were on their way to visit Jerusalem when he was killed. According to the media, thousands attended his funeral and burial. In 2006, it had a population of 737.

In 2008, a large advanced goat pen and dairy, incorporated as Halav Ha'aretz, Susya Dairy Ltd., was inaugurated on Susya's lands with an investment of 3.5 million ILS. It produced goat yoghurt for the Israeli market from a herd of 1500 goats, 48 of which can be milked simultaneously.

Many former Afrikaner Christians, after converting to Judaism, have settled in Susya, which has become a notable stronghold for their group.
