= Beit Yatir =

Israeli settlement in the West Bank

Beit Yatir / Metzadot Yehuda: בית יתיר / מְצָדוֹת יְהוּדָה (Hebrew)
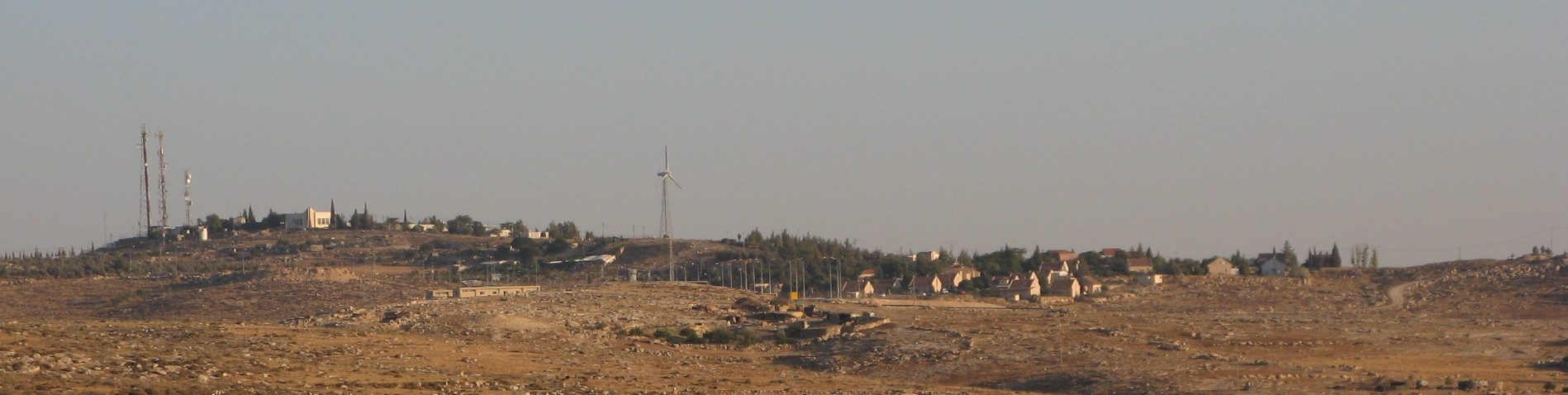

- Location within the Southern West Bank
- Coordinates: 31°22′00″N 35°06′42″E
- Country: Palestine
- District: Judea and Samaria Area
- Council: Har Hevron
- Region: West Bank
- Affiliation: Amana
- Founded: 1979
- Population (2024): 792

Beit Yatir (Hebrew: בית יתיר), officially Metzadot Yehuda (Hebrew: מְצָדוֹת יְהוּדָה), is an Israeli settlement in the southern Hebron Hills of the West Bank, organized as a religious-Zionist Orthodox moshav. Located on a hill, 900 metres above sea level, near the Green Line, south of Susiya, and close to the Palestinian village of as-Seefer, it falls under the jurisdiction of Har Hevron Regional Council. In 2024, it had a population of 792.

The ruins of the ancient town of Eshtemoa are nearby.

The international community considers Israeli settlements in the West Bank illegal under international law, but the Israeli government disputes this.

== History ==
Beit Yatir was established in 1979 by students from the Mercaz HaRav Yeshiva. In 1983, the moshav was moved southwest from its original location south of the town of as-Samu to its current location in the Yatir Forest. A visual landmark of the moshav is a high wind turbine.

The social make-up of the moshav residents varies between sabras to immigrants from various countries, including France, Russia, Brazil, and English-speaking countries. The moshav does not require residents to become members of the cooperative.

== Education ==
A Religious Pre-Army Mechina, with several dozen students enrolled, is headed by Rabbi Moshe Hagar.
