= Yaakov Havakook =

Israeli security officer and anthropologist

Yaakov Havakook (Hebrew: יעקב חבקוק) is a former Israeli security officer and anthropologist.

== Biography ==
He gained his bachelor's degree in Middle Eastern Studies from Tel-Aviv University, his Master's in anthropology from Tel-Aviv and Be'er-Sheva Universities, an additional Master's in political science from Haifa University and graduated from College of National Security.

Havakook started working for the Israeli Ministry of Defence in 1981, while researching undertaking a fieldwork documenting the cave dwellers of Southern Mount Hebron. During his work, he lived with the locals in the caves, khirbas and villages, wore their clothes, ate their food, spoke their language and carried an Arabic nickname. The resulting book, Life in the Caves of Mount Hebron, was published by the Israeli Ministry of Defense in 1985, and is used by both the Israeli army and the Palestinian inhabitants of the caves to bolster their arguments in the ongoing dispute over who has a right to them. His study of the living circumstances among the Negev Bedouin were published in 1985/1986.

Havakkok continued his security career in undisclosed positions. From 1994 to 2011 he served as Head of the Editing Department in the Ministry's publishing house, until the division was closed. From 2011 to 2017 he was Head of the International Communications Unit in the Spokesperson's Directorate of the Ministry of Defence.

In 2011, Havakook stole printers, monitors, keyboards, a PC computer and office supplies. In 2018, Havakook was indicted for theft by an employee, and in 2020 convicted under a plea agreement. He received a five-month conditional prison sentence and fined ₪10,000. In 2021, the Civil Service Disciplinary Tribunal additionally imposed a severe reprimand, dismissing him from the Ministry of Defence, and disqualification from further employment there.

== Awards ==
Havakook won the Itzhak Sade award for military literature in 1999.

== Books ==
- Life in the caves of Mount Hebron (1985) (חיים במערות הר חברון)
- Mibeit Hasecar Leveit Ha'Even ("From the Goat Hair to Stone; Transition in Bedouin Dwellings"; Tel Aviv: Ministry of Defense, 1986)
- Islamic Terrorism: Profile of the Hamas Movement, with Shakib Saleh (Tel Aviv, 1999)
