= Giraffe Heroes Project =

Non-profit organization

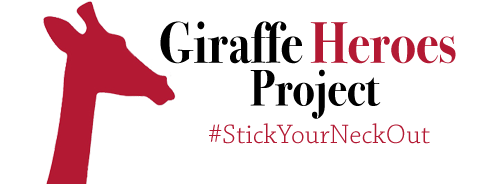
Giraffe Heroes Project

The Giraffe Heroes Project is an international non-profit organization that honors "people who have the courage to stick their necks out for the common good."

== History ==
The Giraffe Heroes Project was set up in the early 1980s by Ann Medlock, a writer and editor from New York, to counter what she believed was the media's over-concentration on negative rather than positive stories. Medlock wanted the project to shine a light on the positive work of those who took personal risks to help their communities. She sought out those she considered to be unsung heroes, recognized them as Giraffe Heroes, and wrote and publicized their stories. She hoped that telling the stories of individual heroes would encourage others to take positive action themselves.

Medlock was joined by John Graham, a former U.S. diplomat, and by 1983 they were both working full-time on the project; eventually they married. As more Giraffe Heroes were recognized, the project gained more support and recognition. As of December 2024, the Giraffe Heroes Project operates in the United States and has affiliates in nine other countries; an affiliate in Egypt was not permitted to operate by the Egyptian government. The project's mission is to show that problems can be solved, and give people the tools and encouragement to inspire them to take action themselves on issues that matter to them.

== Giraffe Heroes Program ==
The Giraffe Heroes Program was established in 1991 to take the project's message into schools. A variety of materials has been developed for schoolchildren of all ages, using lesson plans in three stages - Hear the Story, Tell the Story, Become the Story - to empower and inspire them to take action about the things that concern them in their local communities. The program has been seen to have a beneficial effect on developing children's character, determination, and ability to collaborate to achieve positive outcomes.

== Notable award holders ==
All 1,400+ Giraffe Heroes can be found in the project's database. Some notable award holders are listed below.

- Pat Mooney – Canadian scientist
- Fran Avallone – American reproductive rights advocate
- Rita Swan – Children's rights activist
- Bob Rowe (musician) – American singer
- Samuel Totten – American historian
- Emily Elizabeth Douglas – American businesswoman
- Katherine Freund – American community transport activist
- Joseph Ben Kaifala – Sierra Leonean author, lawyer, historian and human rights activist
- Dawn Wooten – U.S. Immigration and Customs Enforcement whistleblower
- Lara Taylor-Pearce – Auditor general of Sierra Leone
- Neve Shalom – Village in Israel
- Angel Flight – Public benefit flying organizations
- Achiya Schatz – Former IDF soldier, Breaking the Silence spokesman and founder of FakeReporter

== General references ==
- "A Brief History of the Giraffe Heroes Project" (PDF).
