= Angel Flight =

Public benefit flying organizations

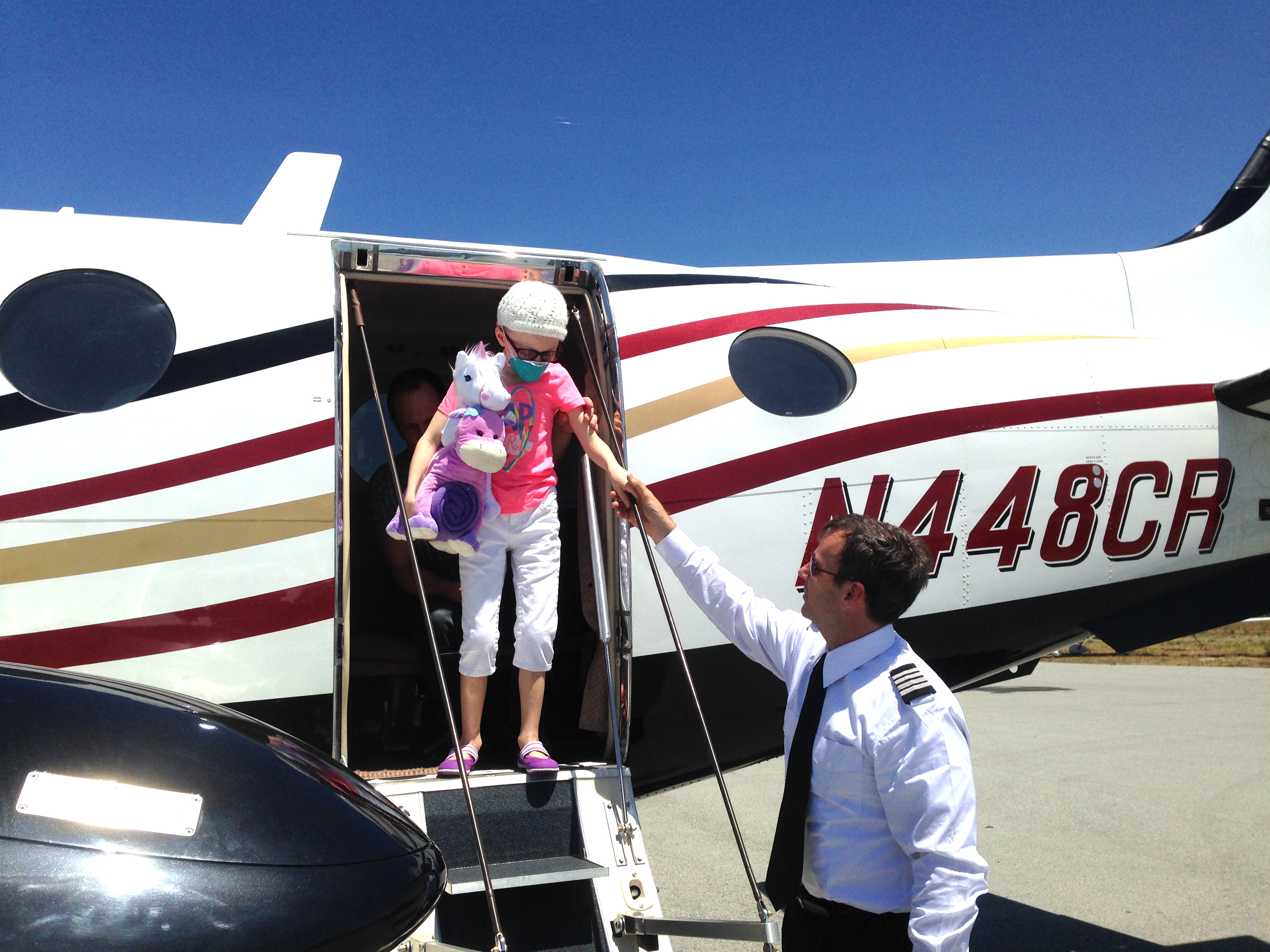
- Predecessor: Angel Flight West, East, Central, Northeast, South Central, Southeast
- Website: www.aircarealliance.org

Angel Flight is the name used by a number of groups whose members provide free air transportation for passengers in need of medical treatment far from home and perform other missions of community service. Such a non-profit organization may be located in the United States, Europe, Australia, or Canada. Transportation is provided by volunteer pilots, often using their own general aviation aircraft. In most of Canada, the Volunteer Pilot Program of Hope Air provides a similar service, along with Angel Flight of Vancouver.

A list of all the Angel Flight and other Public Benefit Flying organizations is maintained by the Air Care Alliance.

== History ==
Angel Flight's first organizations under that name were founded in 1983.

Formed in Santa Monica, California, Angel Flight of California, now known as Angel Flight West, and formed in Atlanta, Georgia, Angel Flight Soars, were the first two organizations formed under the name. Angel Flight of California and its volunteer pilots were awarded the Giraffe Heroes award in 1988.

== Pilots ==
Angel Flight missions are made possible by pilots who volunteer their time, their skills, and the funds required for aircraft operating expenses. Many pilots provide Angel Flights in their own personal aircraft, although some do so using rented aircraft. Pilots must usually meet certain minimum flight experience requirements before they are allowed to command an Angel Flight mission (typically 250-300 flying hours). They also receive extensive training on the special procedures required for Angel Flight missions and patient transportation.

Pilots have a variety of reasons for volunteering for Angel Flight missions. Most do so simply because they enjoy flying, and because providing charity transportation is more constructive than getting the proverbial $100 hamburger or "drilling holes in the sky" (flying just for the sake of flying). The aircraft operating expenses are also generally tax-deductible as a gift-in-kind donation (not in Australia however).

== Requests ==
The Angel Flight organizations do not provide the air transportation; instead, each acts as a "matchmaker," connecting people who have a compelling need for air transportation but cannot afford it with individual pilots who volunteer their time and aircraft, often for a full tax deduction.

Angel Flight organizations typically serve patients who require specialized medical treatment at a facility far from their homes—for example, a clinic that has expertise in the treatment of a particular form of cancer or experimental treatments of rare childhood disorders. In some cases, other compelling human needs are served, such as transportation to visit a hospitalized family member, transportation helping in time of emergencies or disasters, and even relocation of victims of domestic violence. Many of the public benefit flying groups helped in the aftermath of Hurricane Katrina, for example; while others develop partnerships with veteran groups, such as Wounded Warrior Project, to help recovering veterans.

The Angel Flight process usually begins when a referring health professional, usually a social worker, contacts an Angel Flight organization. The referrer describes the points between which transportation is needed, the total number of people and weight, and the condition of the patient. Even though the social worker is responsible for most of the paperwork, Angel Flight organizations encourage patients to contact them first in order to assess fitness.

Not every patient is eligible for transportation. For example, patients usually must be medically stable and capable of walking on their own and sitting upright unassisted. The flight must also not be for treatment of a medical emergency, because weather or other factors may cause last-minute cancellation of the flight. Often a doctor's signoff is required. Therefore, these flights are not considered to be air ambulance services.

If the flight request is deemed appropriate then information concerning the date, source, destination, and total passenger count is added to an "available mission list" on the regional Angel Flight web site or other notification list. Pilot volunteers periodically check the mission list and can volunteer for missions that are appropriate for their aircraft and schedule.

== Accidents and incidents ==
- On June 3, 2008, a Socata TBM-700 tail number N849MA conducting an Angel Flight crashed shortly after takeoff from Iowa City Municipal Airport (IOW) near Iowa City, Iowa en route to Pryor Field Regional Airport, Decatur, Alabama. Crash was possibly a result of extreme change in wind and convective activity. The pilot and mother of the patient survived. The child patient died upon impact. She was sitting on the mother's lap and not restrained by a safety belt.
- On August 12, 2008, a Beechcraft Bonanza tail number N4615D conducting an Angel Flight experienced a loss of control in Instrument Meteorological Conditions (IMC) upon beginning the approach to Boston International Airport (BOS) and crashed in a parking lot in Easton, Massachusetts. The flight was operated under Instrument Flight Rules (IFR), despite the pilot lacking the necessary currency experience to legally fly under instrument conditions. The pilot and two passengers died on impact.
- On 15 August 2011, a Piper PA-28 Cherokee conducting an Angel Flight crashed in rural Victoria, Australia. The aircraft was en route from Essendon Airport in Melbourne to the small town of Nhill in the state's west and visibility was poor at the time of the accident. The pilot and one passenger were killed in the accident, while a second passenger succumbed to their injuries a week later. The Angel Flight had been returning a teenage girl and her mother home after undergoing treatment for juvenile arthritis and led to criticism over the qualification and experience of pilots operating such flights.
- On May 24, 2013, an Angel Flight disintegrated in the air and crashed into a pond in Ephratah, New York en route to Rome, New York, killing the pilot and two passengers.
- On June 28, 2017, an Angel Flight (TB10 Tobago) crashed into terrain near Mt Gambier heading to Adelaide, South Australia killing 78-year-old Adelaide Hills man, Grant Gilbert, who was flying the aircraft, a 16-year-old girl and her 43-year-old mother — Emily and Tracy Redding from Mount Gambier.
- On September 4, 2018, a Mooney M20 N701JM arriving on an Angel Flight mission crashed during an aborted landing and attempted go-around at the Palo Alto Airport in Palo Alto, California. The pilot (and owner of the aircraft) was killed, and the two female passengers were injured.
- On March 19, 2025, a Beechcraft Baron flying an Angel Flight mission crashed at Grenada Municipal Airport in Grenada, Mississippi around 2:30 p.m. Two of the four passengers received treatment for minor injuries. There were no major injuries or fatalities. Officials suspected high winds as the cause.

The (ATSB) Australian Transport Safety Bureau has released the "Draft transport safety report" to ‘Party's with an Involvement’ – As of 20 March 2019 this report is not yet in the Public domain.

CASA (Civil Aviation Safety Authority) has made recommendations to the government to try and address the concerns as described in the "Draft transport safety report".

Angel Flight's CEO, Marjorie Pagani, the Aircraft Owners and Pilots Association of Australia, Queensland's opposition spokesman for volunteers, Lachlan Millar, and Kennedy MP, Bob Katter, have all condemned the proposal, which they say is a gross discrimination against rural people. All have demanded that the federal government intervene to prevent the new standards from coming into being. The Federal Court has dismissed an application from Angel Flight to stay the Civil Aviation Safety Authority's new regulations around community service flights (CSF). In a hearing in the Victorian District of the Federal Court on Friday and Monday, Justice Anastassiou heard arguments from both sides, eventually ruling in favour of CASA and awarding costs against Angel Flight. The issue is now with parliament. The Centre Alliance party has already moved a Motion of Disallowance in the House of Representatives and Senator Rex Patrick has indicated he will do the same in the Senate when it sits again in April.
