= FakeReporter =

Israeli disinformation watchdog group

- Formation: 2020
- Founder: Achiya Schatz
- Official language: English, Hebrew
- CEO: Achiya Schatz
- Key people: Roi Soussan (director of public affairs)
- Website: fakereporter.net

FakeReporter (Hebrew: פייק ריפורטר) is an Israeli disinformation watchdog group founded in 2020 by Achiya Schatz.

== History ==
FakeReporter was started in 2020 by Achiya Schatz with five friends. Schatz started the organization after witnessing the toxicity of online attacks against Breaking the Silence, an Israeli NGO publishing testimony by Israel Defense Forces (IDF) soldiers about Israel's conduct in the Israeli-occupied territories.

In 2021, FakeReporter reported on an Iranian disinformation campaign where Iranian agents infiltrated online spaces on WhatsApp and Telegram used by Israeli activists. In December 2022, FakeReporter and Haaretz identified IDF soldiers as being behind two Twitter accounts used to harass left-wing activists and Israeli journalists since that November. In 2023, a joint FakeReporter and CNN investigation of the Huwara rampage by Israeli settlers in February revealed that the IDF took little action during the rampage.

FakeReporter has debunked online misinformation in the Gaza war, including footage falsely claimed to show Israeli children in cages in Gaza and claims that Israel had faked its own civilians' deaths in the Nova music festival massacre. In 2024, FakeReporter reported on a network of fake social media accounts promoting Israeli government accusations that the United Nations Relief and Works Agency for Palestine Refugees in the Near East is working with Hamas and a disinformation campaign by Israel's Ministry of Diaspora Affairs that targeted American lawmakers with pro-Israel messaging.

During the 2025 Twelve-Day War, FakeReporter uncovered an Iranian influence network of 3,000 Twitter accounts posing as Israelis expressing opposition to the war and blaming Israeli prime minister Benjamin Netanyahu.

== Founder ==
Achiya Schatz (born 1984 or 1985) was raised as an Orthodox Jew, but later left the tradition. In his youth, Schatz was a Boy Scout counsellor. He served in the IDF's Duvdevan Unit from 2005 to 2008, and became an emissary for the Jewish Agency for Israel. After completing his IDF service, Schatz made contact with Breaking the Silence. During Breaking the Silence's tour of the West Bank, he visited the Carmel settlement he had guarded as a soldier, and met with the Palestinian residents of the neighbouring village of Umm al-Khair.

Schatz later joined Breaking the Silence as its communications director. In 2018, Schatz was detained by the Israel Border Police in Mitzpe Yair, together with Breaking the Silence CEO Avner Gvaryahu and lawyer Michael Sfard, while they were leading a tour in the South Hebron Hills. Schatz participated in protests against Israeli government corruption in 2020.

Schatz lives with his wife and their two children. During the Gaza war, Schatz and his family moved to his in-laws' residence outside Tel Aviv. He has been listed as a Giraffe Hero by the Giraffe Heroes Project.

== Operation ==
FakeReporter operates as a non-profit organization. As of 2023, FakeReporter had 15 full-time members, with over 3,000 volunteers who flag images and videos suspected of being false and misleading. Trained experts then analyse the posts to determine if they are fake. In 2024, the group started accepting reports in Arabic.

FakeReporter tracks the activities of Israeli far-right groups. Prior to the Gaza war, FakeReporter focused on helping people targeted with online harassment for speaking out against Israeli government corruption.

During its first year, FakeReporter operated full-time and unpaid. In 2021, FakeReporter started relying on grants and donations to help fund its work. FakeReporter receives funding from the New Israel Fund. FakeReporter is in a partnership with Israeli fact-checking group Bodkim and provides financial support to it.

== See also ==
- List of fact-checking websites
