= Children's Healthcare is a Legal Duty =

American nonprofit organization

Children's Healthcare Is a Legal Duty
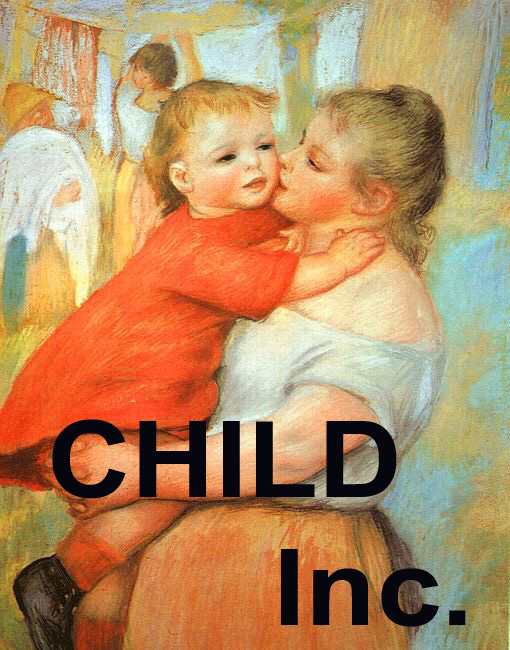
- Abbreviation: CHILD
- Formation: 1983 to 2017
- Type: 501(c)(3)
- Purpose: Child neglect
- Location: Lexington, Kentucky, U.S.
- Field: Child welfare
- Board of directors: Jetta Bernier, Executive Director; Ken Stringer, Chairman
- Key people: Rita Swan, President
- Website: childrenshealthcare.org

Children's Healthcare Is a Legal Duty (CHILD) was from 1983 to 2017 an American nonprofit membership organization that worked to stop child abuse and neglect based on religious beliefs, cultural traditions, and quackery. CHILD opposed religious exemptions from child health and safety laws. These exemptions have been used as a defense in criminal cases when parents have withheld lifesaving medical care on religious grounds. These exemptions also have discouraged reporting and investigation of religion-based medical neglect of children and spawned many outbreaks of vaccine-preventable diseases and deaths. CHILD publicized the ideological abuse and neglect of children, lobbied for equal protection laws for children, and filed lawsuits and amicus curiae briefs in related cases.

CHILD was founded in 1983 by Rita and Douglas Swan after the death of their son, Matthew. When Matthew developed a high fever in 1977, several Christian Science practitioners, who claimed they were healing Matthew, persuaded the Swans not to seek medical treatment for him. After he had been ill for 12 days, the Swans did take Matthew to the hospital, but his illness had progressed too far and he died of bacterial meningitis.

According to the National Association of Counsel for Children, which gave an award to Rita Swan for her efforts, "Due in large part to CHILD's efforts, Colorado, Massachusetts, Maryland, South Dakota, Hawaii, and Oregon have removed laws which provided exemptions from prosecution to parents who fail to provide medical care for their sick children based on religion".

== History ==
Rita and Douglas Swan founded CHILD as a tribute to their son, Matthew. In 1977 he became ill with bacterial meningitis. The Swans, Christian Scientists at the time, were persuaded by Christian Scientist practitioners – the religion's name for its spiritual healers – not to seek medical treatment for their son. When one of the practitioners said Matthew might have a broken bone, which Christian Scientists are allowed to go to a doctor for, the Swans took their baby to a hospital after he had been ill for 12 days, but his illness had progressed too far and he died. Motivated by this tragedy, CHILD worked to eliminate religious exemptions in child health and safety laws. Parents belonging to various religions, in particular Christian Science, have used these exemptions as legal defenses in criminal cases for failing to provide medical care for children who then died.

Following the death of their son, the Swans left the Christian Science Church, and in 1983, Rita Swan founded the nonprofit organization, Children's Healthcare is a Legal Duty (CHILD), and has worked "relentlessly" to publicize cases of religion-related child abuse and neglect. In 1998, Rita Swan and Seth Asser published a benchmark study in Pediatrics that analyzed 140 child deaths in which medical treatment was withheld. This study showed that 90% of these children would have survived with routine medical care.

In 1996, Congress added to the Child Abuse Prevention and Treatment Act a provision that nothing in the act can "be construed as establishing a Federal requirement that a parent or legal guardian provide any medical service or treatment that is against the religious beliefs of the parent or legal guardian". CHILD has opposed this provision on several fronts. CHILD's work has led to the repeal of some or all religious exemptions to child neglect laws in Colorado, Massachusetts, Maryland, South Dakota, Hawaii, Oregon, Minnesota, Ohio, and Rhode Island. In 2009, CHILD lobbied successfully to remove provisions from the federal Affordable Care Act that would have provided government funding and mandated insurance coverage for faith healing that did not also include medical care.

== Mission and activities ==
CHILD'S mission was to end child abuse and religious-based medical neglect, cultural practices, or pseudoscience through public education, research, and a limited amount of lobbying to support laws that protect children against maltreatment. The organization also filed lawsuits and amicus curiae briefs in related court cases.

CHILD supported:

- Laws requiring medical care of children, including preventive and diagnostic measures, without exception for religious belief
- Reporting of child abuse and child neglect without religious exemption
- Licensing of child care facility, including those run by churches
- Ratification of the UN Convention on the Rights of the Child

== Successor ==
CHILD is no longer an active tax-exempt charity. There is, however, a new successor non-profit organization called CHILD USA operating out of the University of Pennsylvania. It was formed with the original CHILD's encouragement and support and is dedicated to ending child abuse and neglect through evidence-based research resulting in enlightened law and public policy.

=== Legal actions ===
The Swans filed a wrongful death suit against the Christian Science Church in 1980, but it was dismissed on First Amendment grounds, and the U.S. Supreme Court declined to hear their case on appeal. In 2000, CHILD sued the director of the Centers for Medicare and Medicaid Services and the Secretary of the U.S. Department of Health and Human Services (Children's Healthcare Is a Legal Duty, Inc. v. Min De Parle), over federal healthcare monies being directed to Christian Science facilities and others that provide no medical treatment. The suit, alleging a violation of the Establishment Clause, was dismissed after the district court granted summary judgment for the defendant; a federal appeals court affirmed the ruling and the Supreme Court declined to hear an appeal.

Other legal cases include CHILD Inc. and Brown v. Deters challenging Ohio's religious defense to child endangerment and manslaughter (ORC 2919.22a) and CHILD Inc. v. Vladeck, challenging the federal government's use of Medicare and Medicaid funds for Christian Science nursing.

=== Testimony before legislatures ===
- Oregon Senate Judiciary Committee, 26 April 2011
- Oregon House Judiciary Committee, 21 February 2011
- Wisconsin Assembly Committee on Children and Families, 17 March 2010
- Nebraska State Legislature, Health and Human Services Committee, 25 January 2007
- Iowa House Education Subcommittee, January 2006
- Maine Joint Standing Committee on Health and Human Services, May 2005
- Nebraska State Legislature, Education Committee, February 2005
- Rhode Island House Health, Education, and Welfare Committee, February 2004
- Missouri House Judiciary Committee, April 2003
- Colorado Senate Health, Environment, Children, and Families Committee, April 2001
- Maryland House Judiciary Committee, March 2001
- Colorado House Criminal Justice Committee, February 2001
- Oregon House Criminal Law Committee, March 1999
- South Dakota House and Senate Health and Human Services Committees, February 1998
- Michigan House Judiciary Committee, February 1997
- U. S. Senate Labor and Human Resources staff briefing, June 1995
- Minnesota House Judiciary Committee, March 1994
- Minnesota House Judiciary Committee, December 1991
- Minnesota Senate Judiciary Committee, March 1991
- South Dakota House State Affairs Committee, January 1990
- California Assembly Committee on Public Safety, October 1989
- Ohio House Children and Youth Committee, March 1989
- Ohio House Children and Youth Subcommittee, March 1985
- North Dakota House of Representatives, January 1979

=== Publications ===
- Swan, Rita (Winter 2009–2010), "Matthew, you cannot be sick", The Dublin Review, no. 37, Dublin, Ireland: Brendan Barrington, pp. 43–69, ISSN 1393-998X, archived from the original on 2013-08-01
- Swan, Rita (2010). The Last Strawberry. Dublin: Hag's Head Press. ISBN 9780955126468.
- Swan, Rita (2010). "Prayer-fee mandates removed from federal health care bills". ICSA Today. 1 (2). International Cultic Studies Association: 18–21. ISSN 2154-820X.
- Swan, Rita (2011). "Chapter 63: Religion and Child Neglect". In Jenny, Carole (ed.). Child Abuse and Neglect: Diagnosis, Treatment, and Evidence (1st ed.). St. Louis, MO: Elsevier Health Sciences. pp. 599–604. ISBN 978-1-4160-6393-3.
- Swan, Rita (2007). "Medical Neglect Related to Religion and Culture". In Jackson, Nicky Ali (ed.). Encyclopedia of Domestic Violence. New York: Routledge Press. pp. 475–483. ISBN 9780203942215.
- Swan, Rita. "Religious Attitudes Toward Corporal Punishment". Ibid. pp. 205–208.
- Swan, Rita (November–December 2000). "Religion-based neglect: Pervasive, deadly...and legal?". The Humanist. American Humanist Association: 11–16. ISSN 0018-7399. Archived from the original on 2013-10-26.
- Swan, R. (1998), "On statutes depriving a class of children of rights to medical care: Can this discrimination be litigated?", Quinnipiac Health Law Journal, 2 (1), Quinnipiac University, School of Law: 73–95, OCLC 36163682
- Swan, R. (Winter 1998–1999). "Letting children die for the faith". Free Inquiry. 19 (1). Council for Secular Humanism: 6–7. ISSN 0272-0701. PMID 11657679.
- "Religion-based medical neglect and corporal punishment must not be tolerated". The APSAC Advisor. 11. American Professional Society on the Abuse of Children: 2–3. Spring 1998. ISSN 1088-3819.
- Swan, R. (1997). "Children, medicine, religion, and the law". Advances in Pediatrics. 44. Mosby: Elsevier: 491–543. ISSN 0065-3101. PMID 9265980.
- "Discrimination de jure: Religious exemptions for medical neglect". The APSAC Advisor. 7. American Professional Society on the Abuse of Children: 35–8. Winter 1994. ISSN 1088-3819.
- "Public policy: Religious exemptions". The Brown University Child & Adolescent Behavior Letter. John Wiley & Sons: 2–3. January 1993. ISSN 1058-1073.
- Swan, Rita (Spring 1987). "The law should protect all children". Journal of Christian Nursing. 4 (2). Wolters Kluwer: Lippincott, Williams & Wilkins: 40. doi:10.1097/00005217-198704020-00016. ISSN 0743-2550. PMID 3644911.
- Swan, Rita (29 December 1983). "Faith healing, Christian Science, and the medical care of children". New England Journal of Medicine. 309 (26). Massachusetts Medical Society: 1639–41. doi:10.1056/NEJM198312293092610. ISSN 0028-4793. PMID 6358892.

== Recognition ==
- American Academy of Pediatrics (AAP): 2012 President's Certificate for Outstanding Service awarded to Rita Swan, MA, PhD for efforts in children's rights to medical care and decades of work with the AAP on these issues.
- Iowa Chapter of the Methodist Federation for Social Action: 6 June 2010 Outstanding Social Justice Work Award.
- Omicron Delta Kappa chapter at Morningside College: 27 April 2003 Honoris Causa Award.
- National Association of Counsel for Children (NACC): 2001 Outstanding Legal Advocacy Award received by Rita Swan, MA, PhD for working to protect children from religious-based medical neglect through policy advocacy and amicus curiae work.
- Oregon Pediatric Society: 17 June 2000 Child Advocacy Service Award.
- Oregon Peace Officers Association Child Abuse and Sex Crimes Investigators: 2 November 1999 Award for Child Advocacy.
- The Giraffe Heroes Project: 12 January 1993 Award for Risk-Taking and Service.
- Sioux City Human Rights Commission: 2 May 1991 Human Rights Service Award.
- South Dakota Chapter of the AAP: 14 September 1990 Child Advocacy Service Award.
