= Bnei Avraham =

- בני אברהם
- Formation: 2005
- Location: West Bank
- Website: bneiavraham.com

Bnei Avraham (Hebrew: בני אברהם; lit. 'Children of Avraham') is an Israeli Jewish religious activist organization that works alongside Palestinian activists to oppose Israeli settler violence and prevent the displacement of Palestinian communities from their land in the West Bank. The organization is affiliated with the Faith-Based Left (HaSmol HaEmuni) movement.

== History ==
Bnei Avraham activists in the West Bank, 16th January 2026

Bnei Avraham was founded in the mid-2000s by a group of young religious Jews, some of whom came from Israeli settlements, with the aim of opposing settler violence in the West Bank and preventing what its founders described as "harm to the inhabitants of the Holy Land." Its early activities included organizing tours of Hebron and facilitating meetings with Palestinian residents. Early members included Rabbi Mikhael Manekin, Hagit Ofran, Yehuda Shaul and Hillel Cohen. Cohen claims that Bnei Avraham were the first to utilize the later widely adopted practice of protective presence, staying in the homes of Palestinians who were targeted frequently by settlers, hoping that their presence could dissuade the violence, and provide an opportunity to document it. The organization became inactive during the 2010s, with most of their activists dissolving into the more structured organizations Breaking the Silence and Ta'ayush, before resuming its activities in 2022. Their members are mainly from religious-Zionist, Masorti, and Haredi backgrounds.

The organization's first activity following its re-establishment involved distributing religious pamphlets (pashkevilim) at the Cave of the Patriarchs in Old City of Hebron during Shabbat Chayei Sarah in November 2022, when thousands of religious Zionist Jews traditionally visit the site. The pamphlets condemned the displacement and dispossession of Palestinian residents of Hebron as a Chillul Hashem (desecration of God's name), declaring that "the hands of Jacob were not created for this." The phrase was attributed to Jewish philosopher Simon Rawidowicz, who used it in a chapter omitted from the original publication of his work and subsequently published under the title Between Past and Future (בין עבר לערב). In the text, Rawidowicz advocated for the Palestinian right of return, arguing that the 1948 Palestinian expulsion and flight was contrary to Jewish ethical principles.

Following reports of violence against Palestinian residents of Hebron during the same weekend, Bnei Avraham organized a visit to the city. During the visit, one of the organization's activists was struck by an Israeli soldier serving in the Tzabar Battalion of the Givati Brigade.

Through 2025, Bnei Avraham activists operated in Ras Ain al-Auja, spending 'protective presence' shabbatons there, something they viewed as a religious duty based on Kabbalistic ethical works, as well as organising activities for children who suffered from settler violence. The Shabbatons involved staying in a house provided by local Palestinian residents with kosher meals, Jewish prayers and religious sermons. When settlers would enter villagers’ homes or threaten residents, the activists would intervene physically to prevent them from doing so.

The organization's activities include organizing tours of the West Bank, particularly Hebron and the Jordan Valley, as well as Jerusalem; maintaining a protective presence in Palestinian communities threatened by settler violence; accompanying Palestinian shepherds; organizing joint Israeli-Palestinian events and raising awareness of conditions in the occupied Palestinian territories through Israeli and international media.

In October 2026, Bnei Avraham was featured in a segment of the American television news program 60 Minutes, during which correspondent Lesley Stahl accompanied members of the organization as they attempted to assist a Palestinian man in returning to his home in Jannata. During the encounter, settlers identified as Hilltop Youth from the Kochav Yehuda outpost nearby the Israeli settlement of Tekoa were filmed physically confronting the activists and obstructing their passage. Israeli soldiers subsequently ordered the activists, Stahl, and the CBS News crew to leave the area.
