= Avner Gvaryahu =

Israeli activist

- אבנר גבריהו
- Born: 1983 or 1984
- Title: Executive director of Breaking the Silence

Avner Gvaryahu (Hebrew: אבנר גבריהו; born 1983/1984) is the current executive director of the Israeli-based non-profit Breaking the Silence.

== Early life and education ==
Gvaryahu was born to a Religious Zionist family. He was raised in Rehovot, alongside his two brothers and two sisters. He attended a yeshiva until grade 12, after which he volunteered with the Israeli Scouts for a year.

After joining the Israeli Defense Forces (IDF) in 2004, he served as a sergeant in the Orev unit of the paratroopers until 2007. While serving in the IDF in Nablus and Jenin, Gvaryahu realized the negative effects of the IDF on Palestinian communities. He later claimed that his commanders encouraged members of his battalion to kill, rather than arrest, targets.

After serving in the IDF, Gvaryahu studied social work in Tel Aviv.

== Activism ==
Gvaryahu was working with Breaking the Silence by 2011. At the time, he worked as a tour guide for the non-profit, showing visitors the impact of the occupation in the West Bank. By 2014, Gvaryahu was the non-profit's spokesperson. In 2018, Gvaryahu, by then the group's CEO, together with its communications director Achiya Schatz and lawyer Michael Sfard, were detained by the Israel Border Police in Mitzpe Yair while leading a tour in the South Hebron Hills.

Gvaryahu has spoken out against Israeli military campaigns in the occupied territories, such as raids on the West Bank's Jenin refugee camp. He has clarified that although he believes Israel has a right to self-defense, he does not believe current military activity in the occupied territories constitutes self-defense.

In August 2025, Gvaryahu wrote an opinion piece for Haaretz where he called on Jews from Israel and abroad to join and support Palestinian communities.

== Personal life ==
In 2016, Gvaryahu became a target in a campaign by Im Tirzu, which accused him of being planted by a foreign government.

Gvaryahu and his wife, who works as a journalist, live in Tel Aviv.
