= Michael Avallone =

American author (1924–1999)

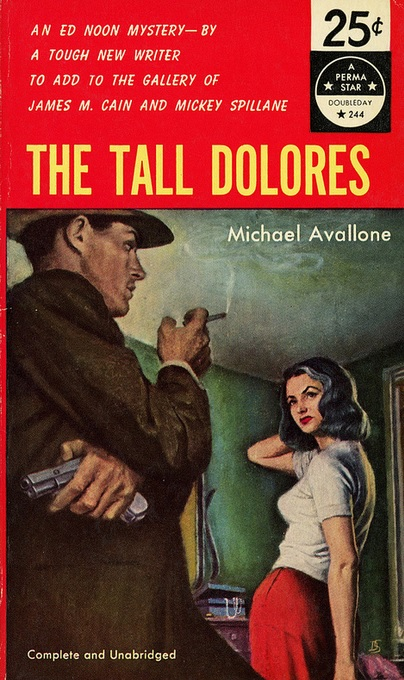
Cover of The Tall Dolores

Michael Angelo Avallone (October 27, 1924 – February 26, 1999) was an American author of mystery and secret agent fiction and novelizations of television programs and films. His lifetime creative output consists of over 223 written works (although he boasted over 1,000), published under his own name and seventeen pseudonyms.

== Biography ==
The son of Michael Angelo Avallone Sr, Avallone was born in New York City on October 27, 1924 and died in Los Angeles on February 26, 1999. He was married in 1949 to Lucille Asero; they had one son before the marriage was dissolved. In 1960 he married Fran Weinstein, and together they had one son and one daughter. In addition to his writing, Avallone was a guest lecturer at New York University, Columbia University, and Rutgers University.

== Works ==
His first novel, The Tall Dolores, published in 1953, introduced Ed Noon, P.I. The most recent installment, Since Noon Yesterday, was published in 1989. The final volume, The Ninth of Never, was never published.

Avallone was prolific at writing movie and TV tie-ins, numbering more than two dozen, beginning with 1963's The Main Attraction. His most successful was the first of the Man From U.N.C.L.E. novels, The Thousand Coffins Affair. "I did it for a flat fee of $1,000 with a handshake deal to do the rest of the series," he said in 1989. "Then Ace double-crossed everybody and they got follow-up writers to do the others. They sold it to 60 foreign countries, and it stayed in print until 1970. Every copy of the book says April, 1965 — there's no record of a printing order or anything — but they had five printings in the first three months! Everything to worked right in The Thousand Coffins Affair and it sort of set the pattern for all kinds of TV spy books. I was very satisfied with it, and despite the monetary beating I took, it did get me a lot of work down through the years." Avallone said he faced some minor editorial restrictions on the U.N.C.L.E. book, at the studio's insistence. The villainous organization of the book, Golgotha, was described by Avallone as being German. "MGM insisted on making them Russians — and of course this is 1964, the height of the Cold War," he said. Due to his involvement in the tie-ins, the cover of the January 1967 issue of The Saint Magazine, edited by Leslie Charteris, erroneously identified Avallone as the creator of the TV series.

His tie-ins included Hawaii Five-O, Mannix, Friday the 13th Part III, Beneath the Planet of the Apes and The Partridge Family. A series of novellas in the late 1960s featured the U.N.C.L.E.-like INTREX organization.

Under the name "Nick Carter," he wrote some of the Nick Carter spy novels beginning in the 1960s. As "Troy Conway," he wrote the tongue-in-cheek porn series Rod Damon: The Coxeman, and parodied The Man from U.N.C.L.E. from 1967 to 1973. He also wrote the novelization of the 1982 TV miniseries A Woman Called Golda, based on the life of Israeli Prime Minister Golda Meir.

Among his other pseudonyms (male and female) were Mile Avalione, Mike Avalone, Priscilla Dalton, Mark Dane, Jeanne-Anne dePre, Dora Highland, Stuart Jason, Steve Michaels, Dorothea Nile, Edwina Noone, Vance Stanton, Sidney Stuart, Max Walker, and Lee Davis Willoughby.

From 1962 to 1965, Avallone edited the Mystery Writers of America newsletter.

== Tie-in pseudonym confusions corrected ==
There were three books published under the "Max Walker" pseudonym, which was not a "house name", but only one was Avallone's, which has led to some latter-day confusion. The first two, authored by Jim Lawrence were #s 2 and 3 in the four-book Mission: Impossible tie-in series of original novels (1967–1969) from Popular Library. The third, a screenplay novelization of The Last Escape (1970), was written by Avallone as a rush-job favor for Popular Library editor Patrick O'Connor (1925–2012) when Lawrence either proved unable to meet the deadline or turned in a manuscript that O'Connor deemed unusable. Why the "Walker" by-line was retained is unknown.

Avallone is also sometimes credited as having written under the pseudonym "John Patrick", but this is also misleading. The confusion comes from a bait-and-switch byline presentation on his novelization of The Main Attraction (1963). The film's screenwriter, the actual John Patrick, was highly prolific and, at the time, very much a celebrity author. The Belmont Books release says "Pulitzer Prize-Winner John Patrick" prominently under the red block-letter title; and in easy-to-miss small print along the bottom of the cover says "Adapted as a novel by Steve Michaels" — the latter name. of course, being Avallone's pseudonym on the project. This highly unusual and no-doubt contractual micro-minimization of the novelist in favor of the screenwriter is repeated on the spine of the book, which doesn't mention "Steve Michaels" at all, and inside the book, on a page facing the title page.

== Awards ==
Avallone was inducted into the "New Jersey Literary Hall of Fame". He was nominated for the 1989 Anthony Award in the "Best Paperback Original" category for his novel High Noon at Midnight.
