= Amiram Levin =

Israeli general

- עמירם לוין
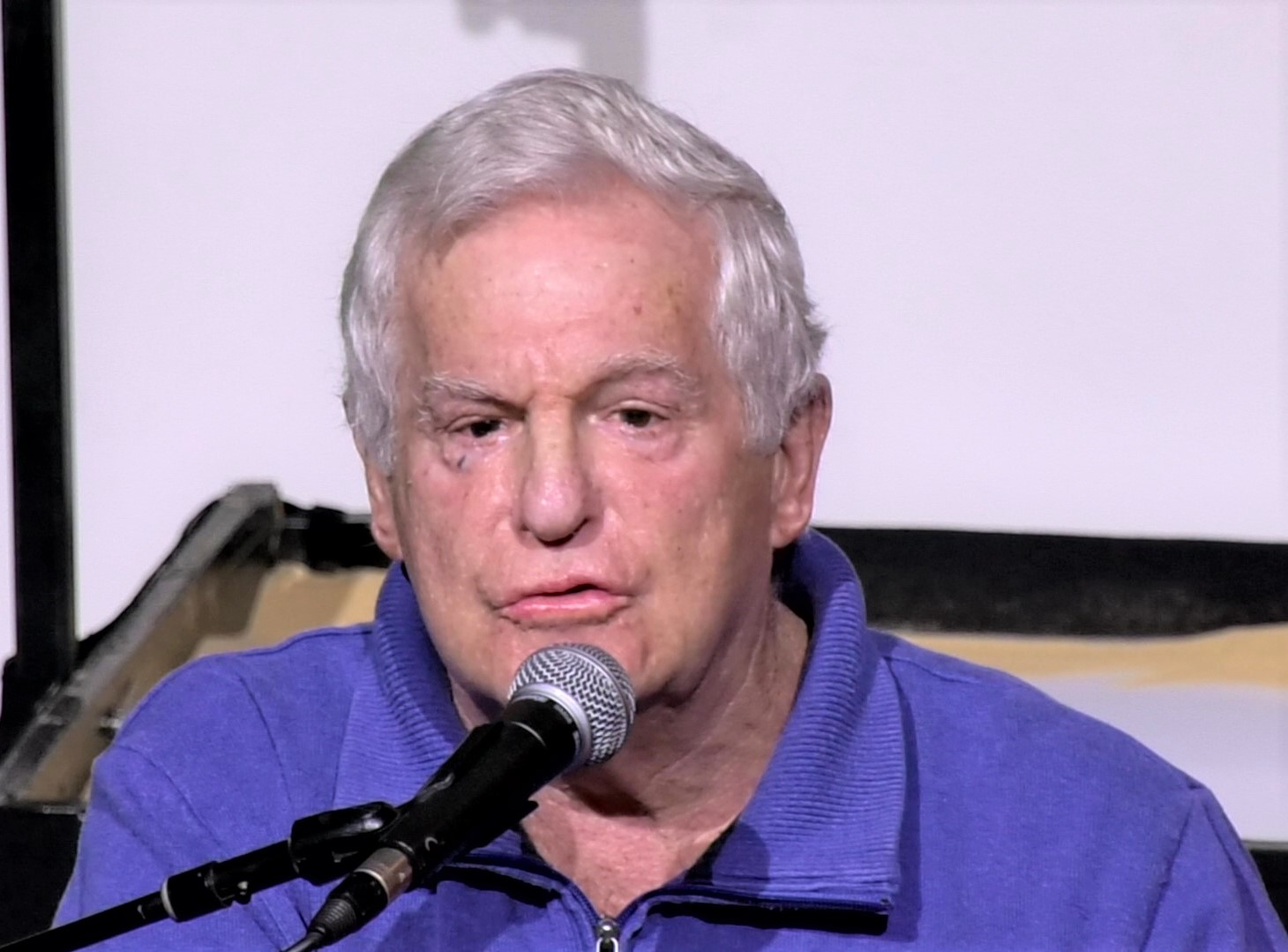
- Amiram Levin in 2020
- Born: 7 July 1946 (age 80); Lehavot HaBashan, Mandatory Palestine
- Military career
- Allegiance: Israel
- Service years: 1965–1998
- Rank: Aluf (major general)
- Conflicts: Six-Day War; War of Attrition; Yom Kippur War; Operation Thunderbolt; Operation Litani; 1982 Lebanon War; First Intifada; Operation Grapes of Wrath

Amiram Levin (Hebrew: עמירם לוין; born 7 July 1946) is an Israeli writer and commentator who formerly served as an aluf (major general) in the Israel Defense Forces and as deputy chief of Mossad.

== Military career ==
Amiram Levin served in Sayeret Matkal and rose to become its commander. He was commander of the IDF Northern Command. He was severely wounded in the Yom Kippur War. Levin served as deputy chief of the Mossad.

== Business career ==
Levin was director and chairman of the National Roads Company of Israel until 2006.

Between 2004 and 2022, he was director of the Israeli branch of the Chinese EKPAC corporation which deal with medical devices, agritech and cleantech. He dealt extensively with the business and technology worlds as an entrepreneur, partner and investor in private and public Israeli technology and cyber companies. Levin is one of the founders of NextVision, an electro-optics company.

In 2022, he was added to the board of directors of Pomvom, a company that develops and provides technology solutions related to artificial intelligence-based digital photography.

== Views and opinions ==
Levin's views on the Palestinian conflict have varied through the years.

According to an Al Jazeera documentary, in 2013, Levin stated at an arms industry conference that Israel's goal in the occupied territories was to create more 'room to manoeuvre' by punishing the Palestinians, adding that, "You have to understand, most Palestinians were born to die – we just have to help them." The documentary was false because at the conference Levin spoke about his view about the element of punishment during wartime in Lebanon and Gaza, where Israel used to fight militant jihad organizations like Hezbollah and Hamas, and did not speak about the occupied territories or the Palestinians specifically. The quote was also distorted and he said: "Most of these guys were born destined to die, so we need to help them", committing to the enemy he is facing without saying "Palestinians".

A leading figure on the Israeli left and member of the Israeli Labor Party, Levin is considered a liberal icon. After losing out to Avi Gabbay in the Labor party's elections in June 2017, he expressed his support for the winner. He has supported Breaking the Silence, and thinks the army has grown soft because of the occupation. He also believes Palestinians deserve being occupied militarily because they refused to accept the borders set out for two states in the 1947 United Nations Partition Plan. He does not accept the borders existing before the 1967 war, thinks Israel was right to conquer the West Bank ('Judea and Samaria') and is on record as advocating the expansion of Israeli settlements. He has also opined that if Palestinians fail to abide by agreements, Israel should "tear them apart" in a future war and forcibly transfer them to "the other side of the Jordan River", i.e. Jordan. Recently he has suggested a loosening of the Gaza blockade, and advocates allowing Palestinians in Gaza the use of an airport and a port, on condition that if rockets continue to be fired against Israel, entire neighbourhoods there should be flattened.

He also espouses the view that the militancy of Palestinian children and youths poses a greater threat to Israel than Hamas, and hasbara (public diplomacy including propaganda) warfare has a key strategic value to counter what he considers is the manipulation of images of Palestinian children resisting the occupation by throwing stones to influence world opinion.

In 2023 however, Levin made headlines for speaking at a protest against proposed judicial reforms. At an interview a day later, he said "there is apartheid in Judea and Samaria, the IDF has started being complicit in war crimes, they stand on the sidelines and watch the Hilltop Youth terrorize the Palestinians and do nothing. The IDF has rotted from the core." He later added "there hasn't been democracy in Judea and Samaria in 57 years. These people (referring to the settlers) do not know what democracy is. They are now rotting the Israeli society from within. These parties (referring to Jewish Power, Religious Zionism, and Noam) now have a part of the majority coalition in Parliament and Netanyahu is responsible for giving them power. He gave the keys to criminals who never served in the IDF, people that in a functioning country would have been behind bars are now in charge of the police." The interviewer then quoted a speech delivered by former military general Yair Golan who claimed that the behavior of some Israelis recalls "horrific processes" taking place in Europe in 1930s, especially in Nazi Germany, and asked Levin if he agreed with his statements. "Of course", Levin replied, "walk around Hebron and you will see streets where Palestinians aren't allowed to be in. It hurts to say this but that's the reality. Better to accept it than to ignore that it is happening".

In August 2025, at a cultural event in Tel Aviv, Levin condemned Israeli government's military rules of engagement amid operations in Gaza and instructions to shoot children and parents seeking food and aid as a genocide, stating in Hebrew:

"The orders that the government is giving to the army today are a crime. You should call a child by his name – giving an order to shoot at hungry children and parents who are looking for a piece of bread is a crime. This is genocide, and that's what we are doing there."
