= Reservists on Duty =

Israeli non-governmental organization

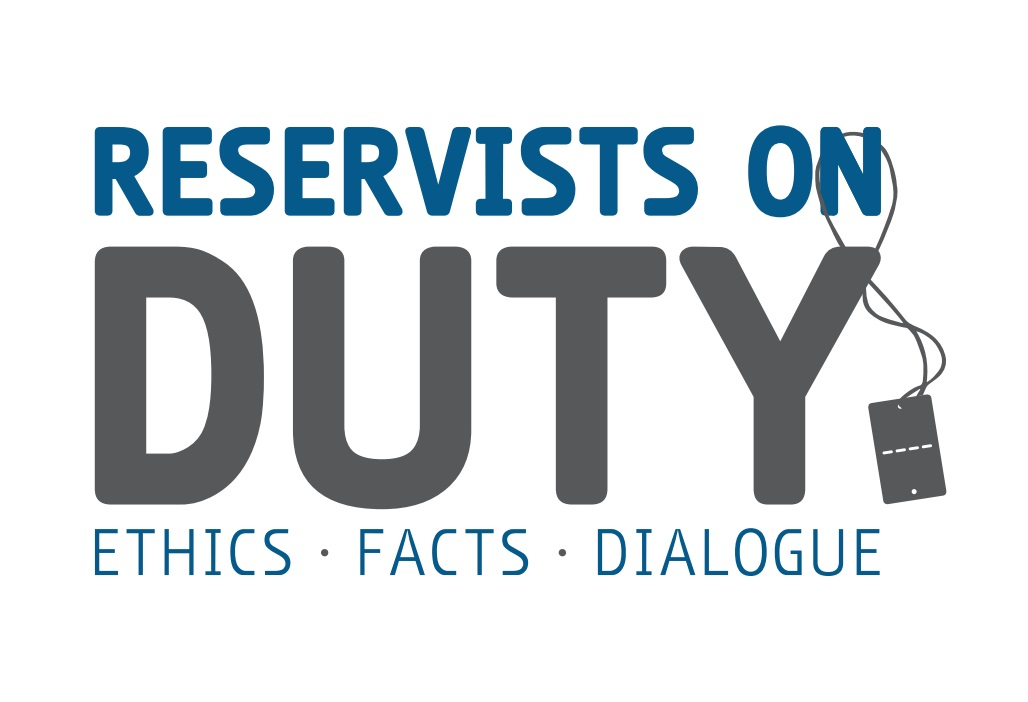
Reservists on Duty Logo

Reservists on Duty is an Israeli non-governmental organization established in December 2015 by Israeli reserve soldiers who sought to counter the BDS movement and - what they saw as - new forms of anti-Semitism. Reservists on Duty works to engage college students through a number of projects which challenge BDS and seeks to reframe the conversation about Israel. Within Israel, the organization focuses on countering organizations that assist and enable BDS and the "demonization of Israel". The organization is funded by private donations.

== Background ==
The organization was established in 2015 by Amit Deri, the former director of the pre-military college, Tavor, in Upper Nazareth. The idea of establishing the organization took shape after Deri witnessed a protest of the Boycott, Divestment and Sanctions movement in Ireland, where spokesmen for BDS grounded their arguments against Israel's treatment of Palestinians with material obtained from Israeli NGOs, such as Breaking the Silence. Deri felt that there was distortion in the way that this material was presented, and decided to combat such misinformation by forming a forum of reserve soldiers who could respond to allegations of misconduct.

The organization was founded after Israeli Defense Force officers and soldiers decided to take action against the activity of Breaking the Silence and signed a petition. They demanded that the Prime Minister of Israel, Benjamin Netanyahu, stop this organization's cooperation with state institutions and particularly the IDF. Moreover, they demanded that he prevent the funding of Breaking the Silence by foreign countries. The petition received the support of over half of the Knesset members.

== Activity ==
The objective of the organization is to expose BDS supporters both in Israel and on campuses across the United States, to share the Israeli point of view about the Israeli–Palestinian conflict, and to make it more accessible and understandable to the public. The organization aspires to become a main source in the field, calling this the "Gideon Group", which is the main project of the organization, where around a hundred volunteers, former lone soldiers, minorities and students are sent to campuses across the USA during the Israeli Apartheid Week, in order to fight the anti-Israeli propaganda and to promote dialogue. These volunteers visit campuses, stay in touch with pro-Israel communities in their area, and generally serve as pro-Israel ambassadors.

The organization sees Pro-Israel American Jews as an efficient and effective cause of influence in the front of the battle field on campuses. In their view, their advantage is understanding the unique challenges around the campuses on the one hand as Americans, and the life in Israel as Israelis on the other. The organization sends delegations of volunteers to campuses in order to interact with students and let them learn another, more personal side to the story during weeks of anti-Israel events.

In Israel, the organization's activity focuses on exposing hidden intentions of Anti-Israeli organizations, such as Breaking the Silence and B'Tselem. Among other things, the organization has established a hotline for former and current IDF soldiers that suffered from harassment from Breaking the Silence asking them (after operation "Tzuk Eitan") to give testimonies from the battles. The organization has also launched complaints against the newspaper, Haaretz. They claimed that BDS activists base themselves abundantly on their reports, which were also given in English. They claim that Haaretz stories promote the demonization of Israel in general and the IDF particularly.

The organization holds conferences in Israel and around the world in regards to ethics in combat warfare and the double standards that they claim exist in the world with regards to the State of Israel.

In April 2017, Reservists on Duty made headlines after posting a response video to the testimony of Dean Issacharoff, the spokesman of Breaking the Silence. In this testimony he claimed that during his service as a platoon commander he hit a Palestinian until he bled, in front of his entire platoon and his company commander. In the response video, posted by Reservists on Duty, Issacharoff's commander and a dozen of his platoon's soldiers stood in front of the camera, and claim that his testimony is a lie and his story didn't happen. This event led the Minister of Justice, Ayelet Shaked, to ask the Attorney General of Israel, Avichai Mandelblit, to investigate Issaharof and prosecute him if his story (that he beat a Palestinian) was true. Issaharof was indeed investigated under warning. The police and State Attorney's investigation determined Issacharoff's testimony was untrue. After the case was closed, some—including Issacharoff, Breaking the Silence and B'Tselem—claimed the police interrogated the wrong Palestinian.

In October 2017, the group organized a two-week tour across US campuses that featured talks from pro-Israel Arabs, including Muslims, a Christian and a Druse.
