= Joseph Ben Kaifala =

Sierra Leonean author, lawyer, historian and human rights activist

Joseph Ben Kaifala is a Sierra Leonean author, lawyer, historian and human rights activist. He is currently serving as the new chairman for the Monuments and Relics Commission in Sierra Leone appointed in 2023 by President Julius Maada Bio. Kaifala set up the non-profit Jeneba Project, with the aim of providing education for underprivileged girls in Sierra Leone and the neighbouring countries of Guinea and Liberia, and also co-founded the Sierra Leone Memory Project to help communities to cope with and heal from past trauma.

== Biography ==
Kaifala was born in Sierra Leone, where he was raised, as well as spending part of his early childhood in Liberia and Guinea. Later moving to Norway, he studied at the Red Cross Nordic United World College (UWC Red Cross Nordic), and subsequently enrolled at Skidmore College in New York, earning a BA in International Affairs & French, with a minor in Law & Society. He holds a master's degree in International Relations from the Maxwell School at Syracuse University, studied International and Comparative Law at Vermont Law School, and is a member of the Washington, DC, bar association, among other qualifications.

He went on to found the Jeneba Project, a non-profit organization with the focus of transforming the educational experience for girls in Sierra Leone, fostering intellectual growth and leadership skills that will "create ripples of social impact across communities". Kaifala is also co-founder of the Sierra Leone Memory Project, an oral-history initiative dedicated to recording testimonies from survivors of the Sierra Leone Civil War.

In 2016, he was shortlisted for the "Outlook Inspirations Awards", initiated to mark the 50th anniversary of the BBC World Service programme Outlook, and honouring people who "have shown real courage and inspiration".

His published writings include Freed Slaves, Freetown, and the Sierra Leonean Civil War, about which Adam Hochschild said: "It's no easy feat to write a country's history in one book, especially when the nation involved has been through as much hope and as much suffering as Sierra Leone. But Joseph Kaifala has managed the job knowledgeably and skillfully, by focusing on key periods of his country's evolution. This is a first-rate guide to understanding the deep historical underpinnings of the challenges facing Sierra Leone today." His memoir Adamalui: A Survivor's Journey from Civil Wars in Africa to Life in America (2018) has been listed as one of the "Best Sierra Leone Civil War Books of All Time". Among his other publications are Tutu's Rainbow World: Selected Poems (2017) and What I Think: Maxims of an African Philosopher.

In 2021, Kaifala became the first Sierra Leonean to be honoured as a Ford Global Fellow.

In 2022, he was appointed a writer-in-residence by the Library Of Africa and The African Diaspora (LOATAD), based in Accra, Ghana, the first Sierra Leonean to receive the honour.

In 2023, Kaifala was appointed as the new chairman for the Monuments and Relics Commission in Sierra Leone appointed by President Julius Maada Bio.

In 2023, Kaifala was the inaugural winner of the Projects for Peace Alumni Award from Middlebury College.

== Selected bibliography ==
- Free Slaves, Freetown, and the Sierra Leonean Civil War, Palgrave Macmillan, 2016, ISBN 978-1349948536
- Adamalui: A Survivor's Journey from Civil Wars in Africa to Life in America, Turner, 2018, ISBN 978-1681626840
