= Protective presence =

Nonviolent civilian protection strategy

International Solidarity Movement (ISM) in the Palestinian town of Ni'lin, 2011

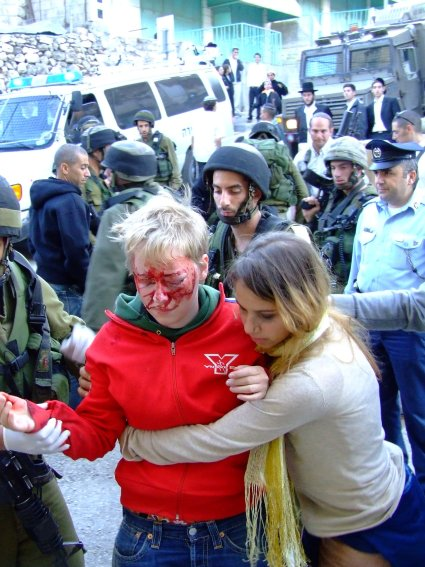
19-year old activist Tove Johansson injured in a protective presence in Hebron, November 18, 2006

Protective presence is a nonviolent civilian protection strategy in which volunteers, activists, or humanitarian workers physically accompany vulnerable individuals or communities to help deter violence, intimidation, harassment, and human rights abuses. Organizations engaged in similar activities include Nonviolent Peaceforce (NP), Peace Brigades International (PBI), International Solidarity Movement (ISM), Community Peacemaker Teams (CPT) and The Humanitarian Guard initiative of Standing Together.

== History ==
Protective presence draws inspiration from Mahatma Gandhi's nonviolent resistance approach. Gandhi employed nonviolent resistance to lead the successful campaign for India's independence from British rule. Organizations like Nonviolent Peaceforce and Peace Brigades International were inspired by Gandhi's philosophy.

=== Peace Brigades International ===
Inspired by the work of Shanti Sena in India, Peace Brigades International was founded in 1981 by a group of nonviolent activists. In 1983, during the Contra war, PBI sent a short-term peace team to Jalapa, Nicaragua, positioning themselves between warring factions. This project was continued and expanded by Witness for Peace, a United States-based grassroots organization founded in 1983 that opposed the Reagan administration's support of the Nicaraguan Contras.

Peace Brigades International also operated in El Salvador (1987–1992), Sri Lanka (1989–1998), North America (1992–1999, in Canada and the USA), Colombia (since 1994), the Balkans (1994–2001, jointly with other organizations), Haiti (1995–2000), Mexico (since 1998), Indonesia (1999–2011, and since 2015), Nepal (2005–2014), Kenya (since 2013) and Honduras (since 2013).

== Methods ==
Movements involved in protective presence often use Unarmed Civilian Protection (UCP) practice. According to the Humanitarian Practice Network (HPN), these practices include: advocacy, multi-track dialogue, confidence-building, proactive engagement, (protective) accompaniment, interpositioning, protective presence, rumour control, ceasefire monitoring, early warning and early response, capacity enhancement and enhancing self-protection. These practices can be divided into three categories: physical protection, training and monitoring.

== Israeli-Palestinian conflict ==
Protective presence (Hebrew: נוכחות מגינה) is a common practice in the West Bank. Protective presence was first introduced following the Cave of the Patriarchs massacre, where Baruch Goldstein opened fire with an assault rifle and killed 29 people, including children as young as 12, and wounded 125 others. In 1995, the first official CPT team was established in the Old City of Hebron.

During the Second Intifada, in 2001, Palestinian activist Ghassan Andoni, third-generation Israeli activist Neta Golan, and Palestinian-American activist Huwaida Arraf founded the International Solidarity Movement (ISM), a Palestinian-led organization dedicated to nonviolent protest in the West Bank and the Gaza Strip, specifically in the Palestinian village of Yanoun. Ta'ayush was also founded a year prior by a joint network of Palestinians and Jewish Israelis to counter the nationalist reactions aroused by the Intifada.

In 2002, the World Council of Churches (WCC), a worldwide Christian inter-church organization, launched the Ecumenical Accompaniment Programme in Palestine and Israel (EAPPI) and started operating alongside international solidarity to organizations in the West Bank.

As of 2026, there are at least 12 volunteer movements engaged in protective presence in the West Bank. More than ten of these organizations operate daily.

== See also ==
- Nonviolent resistance
- Civilian-based defense
- Peacebuilding
- Peace Brigades International
- Nonviolent Peaceforce
- International Solidarity Movement
