= Fran Avallone =

American reproductive rights advocate

Fran Avallone (born Frances Janet Weinstein; 1937–2003) was an American abortion rights advocate. She was director of New Jersey Right to Choose as well as Choice New Jersey, a coalition of 30 abortion rights groups.

== Biography ==
Frances Janet Weinstein was born in 1937 in Brooklyn, New York. A high school graduate, she married novelist Michael Avallone and at 26, miscarried while five months pregnant. Hospitalized in Brooklyn, New York law required medical staff to keep her and the dead fetus on the hospital bed until a member of the state Board of Health arrived to verify she had not aborted. The experience motivated her to advocate for women's reproductive rights. In 1973, she joined the Middlesex County (New Jersey) Planned Parenthood, in 1974 becoming president of the board and later serving as staff director of fundraising (1984-1989). Alarmed by continued restrictions on abortion access despite the Supreme Court mandate in Roe v. Wade in 1973, Avallone founded New Jersey Right to Choose in 1975. She served as its longtime director, growing the organization to 7000 members. In 1978, she initiated litigation contesting a 1975 state law that had banned the use of state Medicaid funding for abortion. In 1982 the New Jersey Supreme Court ruled in favor of the lawsuit, overturning the ban in Right to Choose v. Byrne.

Avallone died December 10, 2003, of lung cancer at her Los Angeles home. She was survived by two children and a stepchild.
