= Hope Air =

Canadian charity

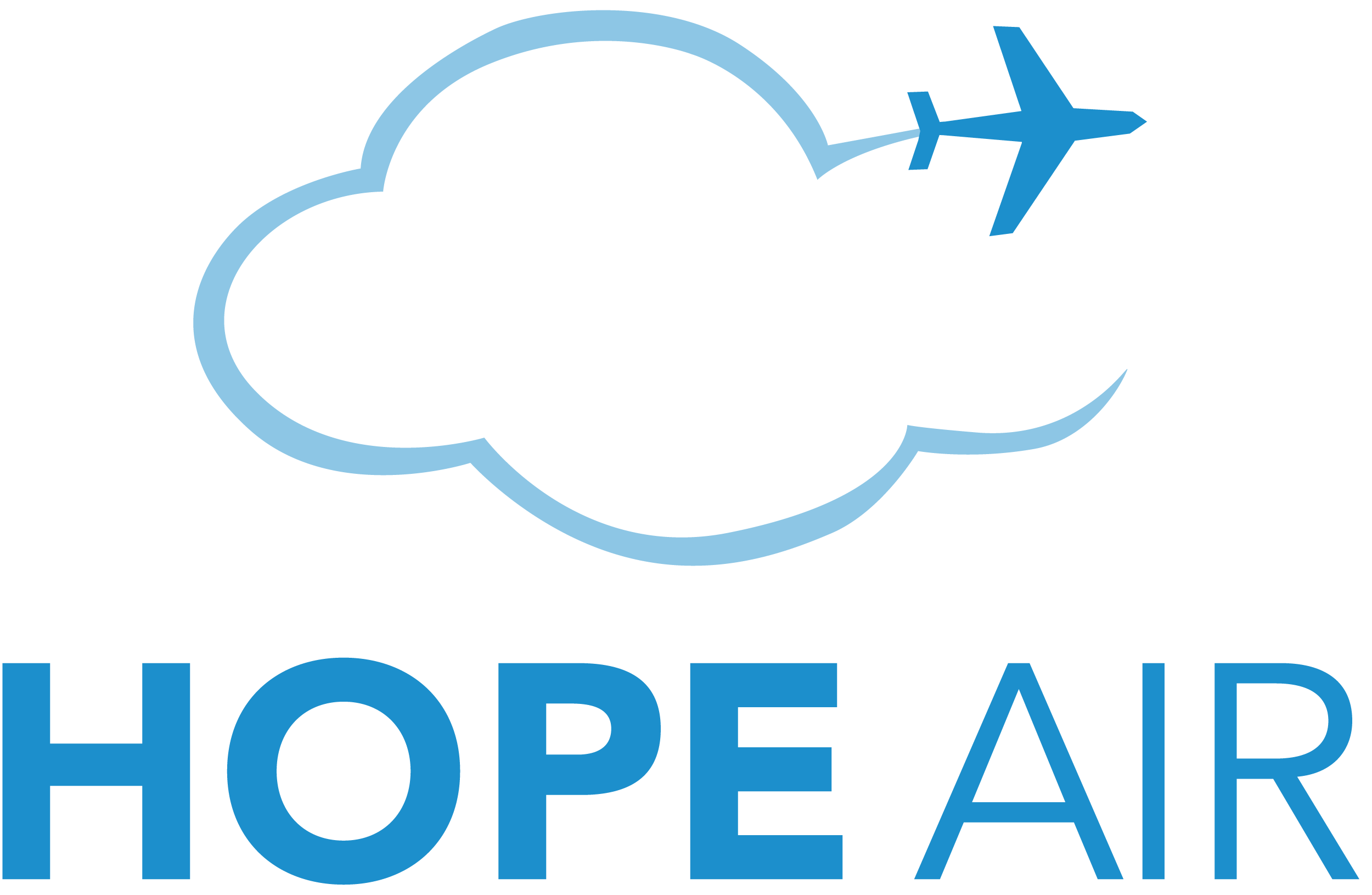
Hope Air's logo

Hope Air is Canada’s national charity that arranges free travel support for low-income Canadians in remote, rural and underserved communities who must travel far from home to access healthcare. Since its inception in 1986, the charity has arranged over 277,000.

Hope Air assists both patients and their caregiver with free flights, accommodations, meals and arrival airport Uber ground transportation. Hope Air arranges medical travel support for Canadians in financial need. Our programs assist patients travelling far to reach specialty medical care. Program availability and eligibility varies based upon province of residence.

Hope Air partners with airlines across Canada to provide donated or discounted flights with , WestJet, Porter Airlines, Central Mountain Air, Pacific Coastal Airlines, Bearskin Airlines, Air Canada Foundation, Northwestern Air, Air Creebec, Harbour Air Seaplanes and Pascan Aviation.

Find out if you are eligible for support at hopeair.ca/travel-support-services.

== History ==
Hope Air was founded in 1986 by Joan Rogers and Jinnie Bradshaw under the name Mission Air Transportation Network. In the early years, corporations signed up with Mission Air to use their planes. However, soon after launching Mission Air attracted commercial airlines, with over 90 per cent of flights taking place through airline partners currently.

By 1993, the organization had provided over 10,000 flights.

In 1995, Romeo LeBlanc, then-Governor General of Canada, became Hope Air's first Viceregal patron. Every Governor General of Canada since has been the charity's patron.

In 1996, WestJet was founded and immediately donated its first flights to Hope Air. Its donations increased and WestJet is Hope Air's largest airline partner.

In 1999, Mission Air changed its name to Hope Air. Also in 1999, Hope Air began to partner with private pilots who began flying Hope Air clients on their aircraft, as part of the charity's Volunteer Pilot Program.

In 2001, Marc Garneau became a National Honorary Patron of Hope Air. He served in this role until 2015, when he resigned after being appointed Minister of Transport.

In 2006, the charity celebrated its 20th anniversary and arranged its 50,000th flight.

In 2010, British Columbia struck a partnership with Hope Air to provide flights to residents of the province who need to travel for healthcare. The province solidified its partnership with the charity by investing $1.5 million in 2015.

That same year, the organization arranged over 10,000 flights, the most ever in a single calendar year. On December 3, 2015, Hope Air celebrated its 100,000th flight.

In 2016, Hope Air celebrated its 30th anniversary. In the same year, Hope Air partnered with Prince Edward Island's provincial government to provide Confederation Bridge passes to Islanders who must travel off the Island to healthcare. This marks the first time in its history that Hope Air provided ground travel to patients.

In 2019, The Hope Air accommodation program is launched, initially in partnership with Airbnb and evolving to include hotel accommodation partners across the country.

In 2022, in order to provide, support for patients in all aspects of their journey, Hope Air launched the Meals and Rides program. Hope Rides delivered through the Uber car transportation network and is available at most Canadian airports. Hope Meals provided in hotel, or through Uber Eats. Uber would later become Hope Air’s official rideshare partner.

== Operations ==
Hope Air provides flights under four main flight programs: Commercial Airline Donation Program, Flight Purchase Program, Volunteer Pilot Program and the Volunteer Program. The charity has a mixed donor base made up of individuals, foundations and corporations. A number of Canadian airlines provide in-kind donations of seats on scheduled flights.

The Commercial Airline Donation Program is based on partnerships with various Canadian airlines that donate seats on flights to Hope Air clients. In these cases the charity covers the cost of taxes and regular fees associated with airline tickets, while commercial airlines provide flight tickets.

The Flight Purchase Program entails Hope Air purchasing seats on commercial flights for Hope Air clients.

The Volunteer Pilot Program partners with private pilots who use their aircraft to fly Hope Air clients to medical appointments.

The Volunteer Program comprises over 160 volunteers across Canada who assist in Hope Air's office and contribute remotely. In 2018, volunteers donated over 5000 hours to sustaining Hope Air's mission in the areas of Client Care, Fund Development, Marketing & Communications, and Ambassadorship.

== Impact ==
Over the past four decades, Hope Air has provided more than 277,000 travel arrangements for over 106,000 patients and their escorts living in more than 700 communities across Canada.

With support from Hope Air:

Patient hospital admissions decrease by 36% and emergency room visits drop 27% with Hope Air’s support

48%of patients remain in their province with Hope Air’s help, indicating they would otherwise have to relocate

Over 33% of patients would otherwise skip or postpone care due to travel costs impacting overall health outcomes without Hope Air’s support

In 2025, 82 cents of every dollar spent by the charity was directed to supporting patient travel.
