= Sioux City Human Rights Commission =

Sioux was a native tribe

- Formation: 1963
- Type: Quasi-Judicial
- Headquarters: City Hall
- Location: Sioux City, Iowa
- Executive Director: Karen Mackey
- Website: https://www.sioux-city.org/government/boards-commissions/human-rights-commission

Sioux City Human Rights Commission is an impartial governmental agency that primarily investigates allegations of discrimination. Other duties include community education and hosting events that promote diversity and the elimination of discrimination. Its tagline is "To Ensure a Fair and Equitable Community for All".

== Background ==
The Iowa Civil Rights Act requires every city with a population of over 29,000 to have an independent commission in order to further its goals. The Commission is represented by eleven citizen Commissioners appointed by the City Council. The Sioux City Human Rights Commission currently has two full-time staff, one part-time secretary and four AmeriCorps VISTA Volunteers.

The Iowa Civil Rights Commission currently has more volunteers than paid staff. Ralph Rosenberg, Executive Director of the Iowa Civil Rights Commission, has referred to the VISTA Project as "a short-term fix for tough budget times".In early 2010, even this program was in danger due to increasing budget cuts. In accordance with the cost-sharing component of the AmeriCorps VISTA project, if the Sioux City Human Rights Commission's budget was not increased, the agency would have lost all of its AmeriCorps VISTA members. Eventually the City Council voted 3-2 in favor of adding $20,592 to pay the annual stipend for two AmeriCorps VISTA volunteers.

== Jurisdiction ==
The Sioux City Human Rights Commission can only investigate incidents of alleged discrimination that have occurred within the last 300 days. The incident must have also taken place within Sioux City. The areas in which complaints can be filed are employment, public accommodations, housing, education, and credit.

All discriminatory incidents must be categorized as one of Iowa's twelve protected classes:

- Race
- Color
- Religion
- Creed
- Sex
- National origin
- Age
- Disability (physical or mental)
- Marital status (in credit)
- Familial status (in housing)
- Sexual orientation

== Complaint Process ==
A complaint form is filled out by a person alleging discrimination. Next, the party to whom the complaint is directed is notified and given an opportunity to respond to the allegations. Investigators then begin collecting information to make a fair and impartial evaluation. During the investigation, both parties will be asked to consider mediation. Although after a complaint has been properly filed for 60 days the Sioux City Human Rights Commission may grant a "right to sue" letter and the person alleging discrimination may begin a lawsuit. In this event, the case will be closed.

When the investigation is completed, commissioners will determine if there is reason to believe that discrimination happened with either a "probable cause" or "no probable cause" finding. If it is "probable cause", the next step is mandatory conciliation. If an agreement is reached, the case will be closed. If not, commissioners decide to either close the case or go to public hearing. If it is "no probable cause", the investigation is then closed. The person who alleged discrimination then has the option of suing the other party at their own expense.

== Events ==
The agency is also known for its wide variety of events that promote diversity and offer educational outreach.

There are currently four annual events they put on:

- "Faces of Siouxland" Multicultural Fair
- Landlord and Property Manager Training (April)
- Fair Housing Workshop for Tenants (April)
- Universal Human Rights Day- War Eagle Award (December 10th)

In addition, the agency hosts forums throughout the year focusing on issues such as immigration, disabilities, and fair housing. Many are broadcast live on a public-access cable TV channel.
