= Breaking the Silence (organization) =

Israeli non-governmental organization

- שוברים שתיקה
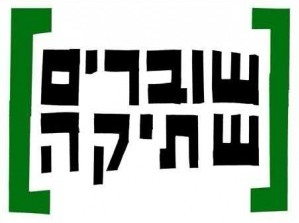
- Founded: March 2004; 22 years ago
- Type: Non-governmental organization
- Website: breakingthesilence.org.il

Breaking the Silence (BtS; Hebrew: שוברים שתיקה, romanized: Shovrim Shtika; Arabic: كسر الصمت, romanized: Kasr aṣ-Ṣamt) is an Israeli non-governmental organization (NGO) established in 2004 by veterans of the Israel Defense Forces (IDF). It is intended to give serving and discharged Israeli personnel and reservists a means to confidentially recount their experiences in the Israeli-occupied territories. Collections of such accounts have been published in order to educate the Israeli public about conditions in these areas.

The organization's stated mission is to "break the silence" surrounding these military activities. Founded to collect testimony from 2000 to 2004 from troops who served in the occupied territories, the NGO has collected and published accounts related to Israeli military operations in the Gaza Strip and other areas since then.

Prime minister Benjamin Netanyahu and other senior political figures have repeatedly criticised the organization, and attempted to dissuade other countries from funding it. At the same time, some senior figures in the Israeli defense and security establishment have defended the NGO. For instance, General Amiram Levin said in 2015 that "Breaking the Silence strengthens the IDF and its morality."

== History ==
Among the Israel Defense Forces (IDF) units serving during the Second Intifada in the early 2000s, there was one in particular, battalion 50 of the Nahal, that in that period consisted of many youths from moshavim and kibbutzim, who had often known each other before their service. Erella Grassiani believed their background was one in which there was more open talk about a two-state solution and perhaps more sympathy for the civilians they encountered.

Members of battalion 50 were assigned to serve in the city of Hebron, which is important to all the Abrahamic religions. This second-largest city in the Occupied Territories had 160,000 Palestinians; it also had 500 Jewish settlers who occupied houses in the city center. Some 500 soldiers were stationed there to protect the settlers, resulting in frequent and close encounters with Palestinian civilians.

Some of the soldiers were disturbed by what took place. Following their service, three reservists collected photographs and made a videotape of testimonies by other IDF soldiers who had also served in Hebron, to show what occurred in encounters between Palestinian civilians and the military. In June 2004 in Tel Aviv, Yehuda Shaul, and two other former soldiers, Jonathan Boimfeld and Micha Kurtz, organized an exhibit called Breaking the Silence, which featured photos and videotapes that "documented their compulsory service in Hebron." They wanted to educate the general Israeli population about what went on in military efforts to control Arab populations of the Occupied Territories. The exhibition was attended by thousands of people and received some international coverage. Afterward, the organizers were questioned by IDF personnel seeking to substantiate apparent abuses by those veterans.

That same year, Shaul, Avichai Sharon, and Noam Chayut (the latter two also members of battalion 50 who had served in Hebron), founded Breaking the Silence (BtS), a non-governmental organization (NGO). They set up a website, www.shovrimshtika.org, and advertised that they would confidentially collect and record testimonies by veterans of their military experiences in the Occupied Territories since the start of the Second Intifada (2000). They also volunteered to speak to youth groups, schools and community groups about their experiences. They traveled all across Israel to collect such accounts. The NGO attracted hundred of members in its first year.

For more than a decade, Breaking the Silence has published booklets and books that are collections of soldiers' accounts in order to educate the public about the reality of military operations by Israeli soldiers in the territories. These publications are listed below and in the External Links section, with information for downloading the texts.

BtS also posts written and videotaped reports on its official website. In addition, members have conducted speaking tours throughout Israel, Western Europe, and the United States.

=== Officials ===
Shaul, who had completed two tours of duty in Hebron, served as the first executive director of BtS. In 2007 he became its foreign relations director, as the organization began to seek outside support for funding for its programs, in addition to providing direct aid to refusenik members and their families. It began to gain support from some church groups in various countries, primarily in Europe, as well as some direct support from some European governments and international groups.

In 2007 Mikhael Manekin became executive director of BtS. In 2012 Dana Golan was serving in this post. According to the organization's website in 2017, the current executive director is Avner Gvaryahu.

=== Funding sources and issues ===
Breaking the Silence is funded through grants, including some from sources in Europe. In 2007, the NGO received a total of NIS 500,000. In 2008, it raised NIS 1.5 million, in 2009, around €275,000, and in 2014, NIS 3.8 million. According to the NGO Monitor website, between 2010 and 2014, foreign sources accounted for 65% of the group's funding. Breaking the Silence published its financial statements as of December 31, 2014, listing major donors who contributed more than 20,000 NIS that year. This included funding from the New Israel Fund, amounting to NIS 229,949, and funding from foreign governments.

Breaking the Silence representatives who traveled to the United States to speak on college campuses and to Jewish communities were sponsored in 2007 by Jewish and Palestinian organizations.

In 2008, BtS told The Jerusalem Post that the British Embassy in Tel Aviv gave the organization NIS 226,589 (c €40,000); the Dutch Embassy donated €19,999; and the European Union gave €43,514. In addition, during 2008, Spain is reported to have provided tens of thousands of euros to fund patrols run by Breaking the Silence in the city of Hebron. The Women Soldiers' Testimonies report, published in January 2010, was funded by The Moriah Foundation, the New Israel Fund, ICCO, SIVMO, Oxfam GB, the British Embassy in Tel Aviv, the EU, and the Spanish Agency for International Development Cooperation.

In 2010, according to Moshe Dann, writing in The Jerusalem Post, Breaking the Silence's budget was NIS 3.1 million. It received a total of 1.5 million from the EU, and the UK and Spanish governments. The rest came from Oxfam, the New Israel Fund; Dutch, German, Danish and Irish church organizations; and NDC, the Palestinian NGO that promotes Boycott, Divestment and Sanctions (BDS) campaigns. In 2014, the NGO received the majority of its funding from foreign governments.

== Relation to other activism ==
Other Israelis and Palestinians have also been concerned about the conduct of Israeli soldiers in the Occupied Territories. A case reached the Israeli Supreme Court that challenged the IDF policy known as the "neighbor procedure". This is the term for Israeli soldiers' using Palestinian civilians as human shields in order to protect soldiers during their operations from suspected booby traps or attacks by Palestinian militants. The Israeli Supreme Court in 2005 prohibited the "neighbor policy", saying that Israeli troops could not use Palestinians as shields.

In May 2011, 24 former IDF soldiers provided testimony describing continued military use of the "neighbor procedure". As reported by The Guardian, veterans through BtS also described daily harassment of Palestinians at military checkpoints and the deliberate ransacking of their homes.

== Activities ==
=== Anonymous soldier testimonies ===
Since 2004, Breaking the Silence has run a testimonies collection project called "Soldiers Speak Out". By 2009 they had collected several hundred testimonies, many of them anonymous, from "those who have, during their service in the IDF, the Border Guard, and the Security Forces, played a role in the Occupied Territories."

Breaking the Silence says that confidentiality is necessary because the IDF allegedly prohibits service personnel from speaking publicly about their activities. As is typical of many large organizations, only official military spokesmen are allowed to speak to the media. Breaking the Silence officials say that they can provide personal details of soldiers to official and independent investigations, on the condition that the identities of soldiers are not made public.

In April 2008, BtS released a report about the state of affairs in the West Bank city of Hebron. It included 39 eyewitness accounts by Israeli soldiers who had served there.

The report generated widespread controversy and public debates in Israel about the implications of its ongoing occupation of Palestinian territories. Publication of additional collections since then has generated additional controversy and renewed discussions after each event.

=== Hebron tours ===
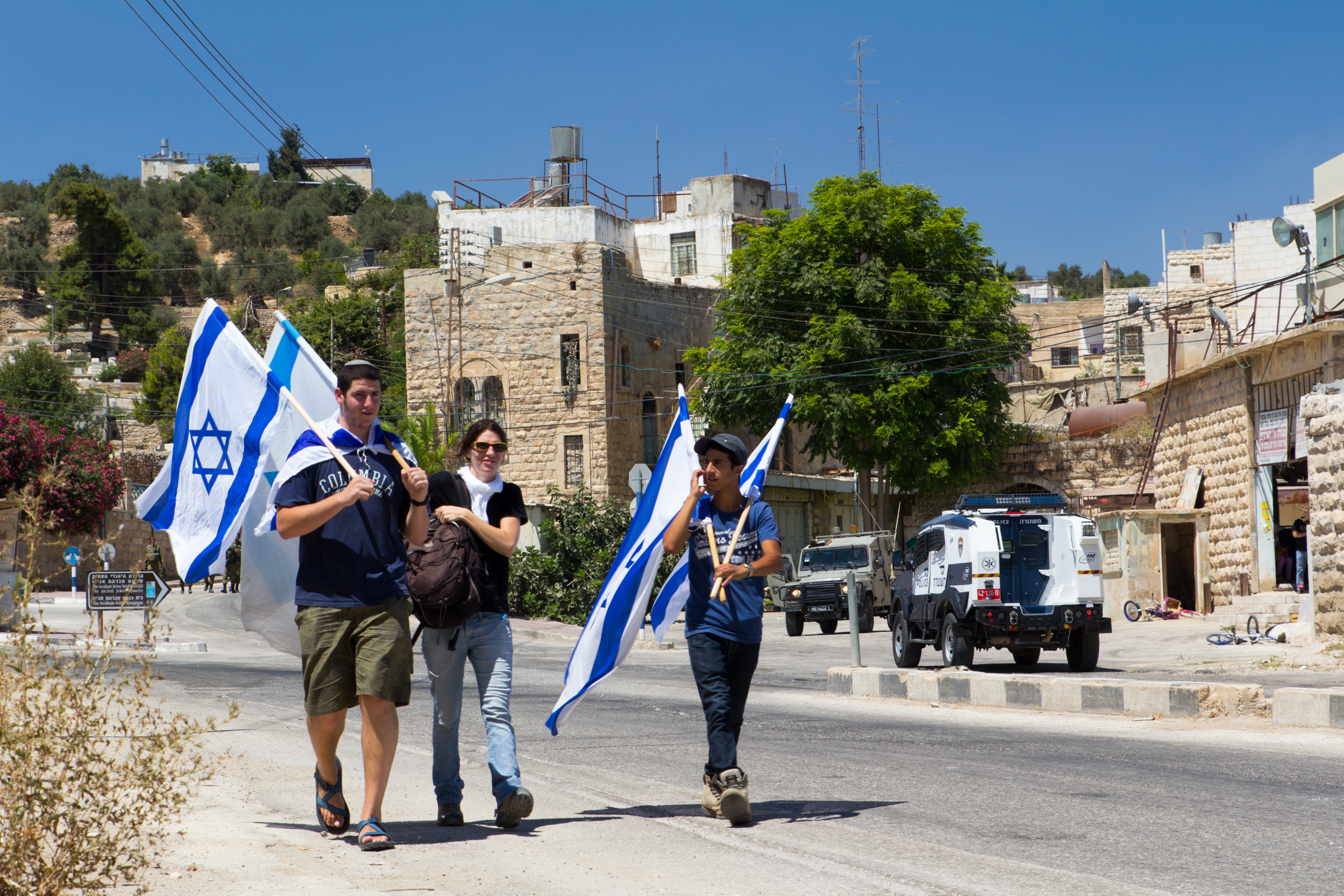
Breaking the Silence chairwoman Yuli Novak is accompanied by settler youth during a BtS tour of Hebron, 2015.

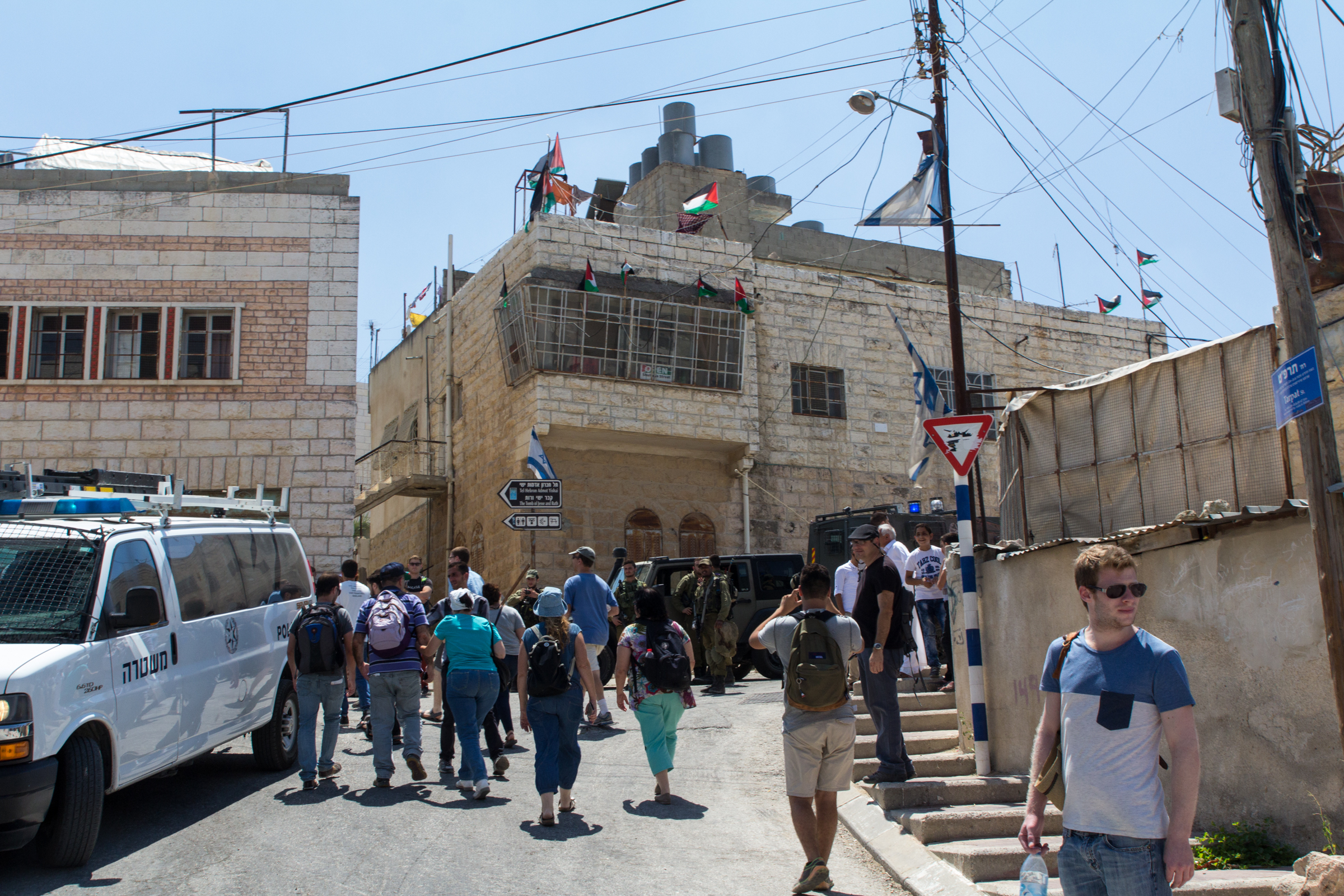
BtS tour of Hebron, August 2015

Since 2005, BtS has been conducting tours to Hebron for members of the Israeli public and foreign visitors. BtS wants the Israeli public to witness the realities in the Occupied Territories. In August 2008, the Israeli police cancelled the tours temporarily because a group of United Kingdom diplomats were harassed by Jewish settlers. The settlers taunted tour members and threw stones and eggs at them.

That year, Commander Avshalom Peled, the head of the Israel Police's Hebron district, criticized both Breaking the Silence and Bnei Avraham, another group in Hebron. He said, "The left-wing organizations have become an even greater threat than the anarchists." In June 2008, Peled said that he believed that BtS provoked settlers in the hope of producing a violent response for public reaction.

Bnei Avraham says that it is "committed to 'disturbing the occupation, disrupting the segregation and apartheid regime'." Police said that BtS and Bnei Avraham had held an illegal rally during a Hebron tour on 25 April 2008.

MK Zehava Gal-On (Meretz) responded to Ynet reporting of police statements in Hebron, saying, "It would seem as though the police are working for the Kahanist and fascist groups in Hebron. I call on the internal security minister to conduct an investigation into the conduct of police forces in Hebron."

In his 2014 book Jewish State, Pariah Nation, American journalist Jerold Auerbach, who has been described as a proponent of right-wing Zionism, reported that some former soldiers expressed antipathy to the Jewish settlers in the West Bank.

=== Lectures and forums ===
BtS sponsors exhibits and lectures in Israel and abroad about military activities in the Occupied Territories, where Israel has had a presence for 50 years. Its representatives are available to speak in community centers and schools.

For example, in April 2017, BtS held a panel discussion at the Barbur gallery in Jerusalem, featuring two former chiefs of Israel's Shin Bet internal security agency, a retired senior police commander, and a respected law professor, who spoke about "the corrosive effect of 50 years of occupation on Israel's security forces and citizens." Ami Ayalon, one of the former Shin Bet chiefs, was "also a commander in chief of the Israeli Navy and is a recipient of Israel's highest military decoration, the Medal of Valor." The speakers also said they wanted to defend free speech. Outside the gallery, protesters called the panel members "traitors." Prime Minister Netanyahu cancelled a scheduled high-level visit the week of April 25, 2017 with German minister of foreign affairs, Sigmar Gabriel, after he had met with Breaking the Silence representatives while in Israel.

== BtS publications ==
=== Soldiers' Testimonies from Operation Cast Lead, Gaza 2009 ===
A booklet, Soldiers' Testimonies from Operation Cast Lead, Gaza 2009. was compiled from accounts by about 30 reserve and regular combat soldiers from various units that participated in the fighting. Some 54 incidents were described of "firing of phosphorus gas in the direction of populated areas, the killing of innocent victims [using] small arms, destruction of hundreds of houses and mosques for no military purpose." Soldiers also described using Palestinian civilians as human shields. The BBC said, "If true, that was a clear breach of the international laws of war—which say soldiers have a duty of care to non-combatants—and of Israeli law." The human shield tactic had been specifically prohibited since 2005 by an Israeli Supreme Court ruling.

The accounts said that commanders ordered soldiers to prevent harm to Israeli soldiers by any means necessary. Brigade, battalion, and company commanders conducted morale-building talks that resulted in soldiers having "zero patience for the life of enemy civilians." These soldiers' testimonies exposed gaps between the official policies of the Israeli military and events on the ground.

The IDF dismissed this BtS report. A military spokeswoman said that it was "investigating many of the requests from NGOs and other groups, but when you have a report that is based on hearsay, with no facts whatsoever, we can't do anything with it." The IDF said that past investigations of allegations had found them to be second- or third-hand accounts, rather than the witnesses' own experiences. A Breaking the Silence spokesman said that the NGO verified its information by cross-referencing the testimonies, and confirming accounts from more than one source before publication.

Journalist Amos Harel wrote "while there is no definite way of vouching for the credibility of their reports, it is safe to say that [the testifiers] did fight in Gaza and that they provided enough authentic detail to prove that they are not imposters." Harel also wrote, "On the flip side, Breaking the Silence ... has a clear political agenda, and can no longer be classified as a 'human rights organization'. ... The organization has a clear agenda: to expose the consequences of IDF troops serving in the West Bank and Gaza. ... But this does not mean that the documented evidence, some of which was videotaped, is fabricated."

=== Women Soldiers' Testimonies ===
In January 2010, Breaking the Silence published a booklet titled Women Soldiers' Testimonies that contained 96 anonymous accounts from more than 40 women officers, commanders and soldiers in various units who had served as combatants and in supporting combat roles in the Israeli-occupied territories since 2000. The booklet lists the rank, unit, and location of the soldiers who provided the testimonies. Ynetnews published excerpts from the report, summarizing them as showing the military's "systematic humiliation of Palestinians, reckless and cruel violence, theft, killing of innocent people and cover-up."

In response, an IDF representative said, "These are anonymous testimonies, without any mention of a time or a place, and their reliability cannot be examined in any way. The IDF is a controlled state organization, which learns and draws lessons, and cooperates with any serious body with the shared goal of exhausting any inquiry when such an examination is inquired."

=== Occupation of the Territories: Israeli Soldier Testimonies 2000–2010 ===
Occupation of the Territories: Israeli Soldier Testimonies 2000–2010, published in 2011, contains first-hand accounts by more than 100 Israeli soldiers. It was published in the United States as Our Harsh Logic: Israeli Soldiers' Testimonies from the Occupied Territories, 2000–2010.

David Shulman, Professor of Humanistic Studies at the Hebrew University of Jerusalem, described the book in The New York Review of Books as "one of the most important published on Israel/Palestine in this generation."

Elliott Abrams, former U.S. Assistant Secretary of State and senior fellow for Middle East studies at the Council on Foreign Relations, wrote that the report contained many accounts of experiences during the Second Intifada. He wrote that the Israel Defense Forces were trying to stop numerous terrorist acts and suicide bombings that were "maiming and killing thousands" of Israeli civilians and criticized the book for failing to describe those dangers. He wrote that "the book's description of a West Bank living in deliberately inflicted misery does not comport with reality."

=== This Is How We Fought in Gaza ===
This is How We Fought in Gaza: Soldiers' testimonies and photographs from Operation 'Protective Edge' -(2014) is a collection of soldiers' testimonies and photographs related to Operation Protective Edge conducted in Gaza. The Guardian said that the testimonies "raised serious questions over whether Israel's tactics breached its obligations under international law to distinguish and protect civilians." Some 2200 Palestinians were killed during the war, including women and children.

== Criticism ==
Critics of the organization, including the Israeli right-wing and governmental figures, have claimed that it lacks credibility due to the anonymity of reports and that fabrications and exaggerations could be published, a claim the organization refutes saying that it corroborates and individually verifies each account before publication, and that it held accounts including "hair-raising testimonies" which it could not independently corroborate. BtS has been criticised for publishing testimonies instead of handing them over to the army. BtS said it did provide testimonies to the army in earlier years, but stopped doing so since the military police starting investigating the testifiers themselves, and that military police investigations only rarely lead to indictments or convictions. Many testimonies are not anonymous, and include names and faces, and the organization says that the anonymous ones are so to protect the soldiers behind them from investigation or out of privacy concerns. The organization has been criticized for being foreign funded, which it does not deny, and according to journalist Haggai Matar does not matter, because "[e]very country has an agenda and interests. Every organization, every institution and every individual person has an agenda. What's wrong with having an agenda? It's the testimonies themselves that deserve to be debated, not who paid the book binder and the graphic designer who created the cover art." The organization holds most of its events in Israel, in addition to holding overseas events.

== Reaction of government ==
The Israeli political establishment has been hostile to the activities of the organization since it was founded in 2004. It believes that BtS emphasizes negative aspects of Israeli military operations and threatens its state security, "part of an advocacy campaign intended to harm Israel's image overseas."

But in 2009, at a government-sponsored training program, other veterans not connected to BtS also spoke out about abuses by the military in the Occupied Territories. In early 2009, some veterans took part in a discussion at the Rabin Pre-Military Academy, at Oranim Academic College, revealing Israeli abuses during the Gaza War. Three said that civilians were shot and killed. When this material was reported, a furor arose in Israel, and the controversy was covered internationally.

Previously the Israeli government had dismissed as propaganda Palestinian assertions that Israeli forces had used indiscriminate and disproportionate firepower in civilian areas during the ground assault. But IDF veterans' accounts at this post-operation discussion confirmed at least some of those allegations.

The IDF quickly conducted an inquiry into these accounts. On March 31, 2009, the Military Advocate General said that these soldiers' accounts that the IDF had been ordered to shoot civilians appeared to be based on hearsay rather than their own experiences. Its investigation found no corroborating evidence for such charges and it closed the inquiry.

Later that year BtS published its own report on the Gaza operation, a compilation of some 70 veterans' accounts. Representatives of the Israeli military criticised BtS for publishing anonymous accounts, saying that it made it impossible to investigate reported abusive incidents. Breaking the Silence officials said they could give personal details concerning the soldiers who provide testimonies to official and independent investigations, on the condition that the soldiers' identities were not made public.

Following the 2009 BtS report, the Israeli government protested to other governments. It said that the NGO had "a clear anti-government agenda" and complained to diplomatic personnel of the UK, Netherlands, and Spain to try to dissuade them from continuing their financial support of BtS. The Israeli Ambassador to the Netherlands said that Breaking the Silence was a "legal and legitimate organization", but said that its funding by the Dutch government was unreasonable "in light of the political sensitivities." Another senior Israeli official said in 2009: "A friendly government cannot fund opposition bodies. We are not a third world country." Journalist Jonathan Cook reported in The National (Abu Dhabi) that the government campaign was promoted by Avigdor Lieberman, Israeli Minister of Foreign Affairs and Deputy Prime Minister of Israel, but also had the backing of Prime Minister Benjamin Netanyahu. Ehud Barak, Israel's defence minister, said: "Criticism directed at the IDF by one organisation or another is inappropriate and is directed at the wrong place."

In response, ten Israeli-based human rights organizations published a petition ("Do not silence 'Breaking the Silence") against what they described as the "aggressive repression of the organization by the Foreign Ministry of Israel and other governmental agents;" they opposed the government's attempt to interfere with the group's funding.

Leading politicians of Likud have continued to express hostility to the NGO and other left-wing activist organizations that oppose the settlements and Israel occupation. For instance, in 2015 Prime Minister Benjamin Netanyahu criticised BtS in an address to the Knesset. His Education Minister Naftali Bennett issued guidelines directing schools to refrain from having representatives speak who were critical of the IDF. In December 2015 Israeli Defense Minister Moshe Ya'alon banned Breaking the Silence from taking part in any IDF events.

As some principals did not observe the Education Minister's guidelines, in December 2016 Education Minister Bennett proposed a bill to Knesset to "ban all groups 'that work to damage the IDF' from entering any academic institutions." The bill is believed to be "primarily directed at the Breaking the Silence organization, but gives the education minister the power to ban any group deemed hostile to the IDF from entering schools."

In response, some of Israel's top brass have come to the defense of the organization. For instance, Retired Major General Amiram Levin published an ad in the Times of Israel, saying that "Breaking the Silence guards IDF soldiers in the impossible place in which politicians have abandoned them."

In 2016, the Attorney General filed a petition to force BtS to reveal the identity of a soldier whose testimony raised suspicion of possible war crimes related to Operation Protective Edge in Gaza in 2014. Previous court challenges by the IDF have resulted in the court upholding BtS's protection of the confidentiality of its sources.

In April 2017, Prime Minister Netanyahu cancelled a meeting with Germany's foreign minister, Sigmar Gabriel, after the statesman had met with the Breaking the Silence group during his visit to Israel. Germany has in other ways supported Israel at a time of increasing criticism from Europe of its settlements in the Occupied Territories and treatment of civilians there.

In June 2017, police investigated an allegation of war crimes made by Justice Minister Ayelet Shaked against BtS spokesperson Dean Issacharoff. The investigation was ordered because of a speech in which Issacharoff said that, as an officer in the Nahal Brigade, he had beaten an unarmed Palestinian protester in Hebron.

A month later, Reservists on Duty released a video in which some former members of Issacharoff's platoon said the incident did not take place and said he had lied. Police closed their investigation several months later, saying that they had located and interviewed the alleged victim and concluded the assault described by Issacharoff had not occurred.

Following this, a former member of Issacharoff's military company came forward and said he had witnessed the beating. Breaking the Silence said that investigators failed to question the man that Issacharoff had beaten, but had instead questioned a different Palestinian man whom Issacharoff had arrested on a different occasion.

Issacharoff termed the investigation a "farce." His attorney said that in "the entire history of Israeli occupation, a file has never been opened so quickly, the Palestinian victim has not been located so quickly and a decision to close the probe has not been made so quickly. This raises the suspicion that this was a political maneuver and not based on relevant considerations."

=== Criticism of anonymity of accounts ===
In September 2012, in the wake of a Breaking the Silence report that alleged IDF abuse of Palestinian children, Danny Lamm, president of the Executive Council of Australian Jewry, expressed his concern that the Israel Defense Forces were unable to investigate claims because they were presented as "anonymous ... devoid of critical detail and untested by any kind of cross-questioning." Lamm said that BtS was exploiting the testimonies "for propaganda effect".

Dana Golan, executive director of Breaking the Silence, said that the testimonies "meet the highest standards of investigative journalism" and unusual cases are "corroborated by two independent sources." In a statement co-signed by 15 ex-soldiers, she accused Lamm of "pontificating from afar."

In 2009, a BtS spokesman had written that the NGO verified its information by cross-referencing the testimonies it collected, and that BtS would provide additional information to "any official and independent investigation", including the personal identity of the soldiers, so long as the names were kept confidential.

=== Reliability of testimonies ===
Over the years, Breaking the Silence has sometimes been accused by groups affiliated with the Right, such as Im Tirtzu, of fabricating soldiers' testimonies. This issue was brought up again during December 2016 debate over a proposed Knesset bill to ban groups from state schools that "work to damage" the IDF. This effort was believed to be directed primarily at Breaking the Silence.

In July 2016, the investigative television program HaMakor reported that, of a sample of ten of BtS published testimonies, two were factual, two were false, two were exaggerated, and four were unverifiable.

Raviv Drucker, a supporter of the NGO, said in the HaMakor program that the group's members "act a little bit like a sensational magazine" that does not check the facts thoroughly or writes an exaggerated headline, while claiming to hold higher standards. He said that "many of the stories they published turned out to be true", and that they are holding on to "very sexy testimonies" and not publishing them because they have not yet been able to "fully verify them." BtS responded to the program on its website.

== Support ==
In 2012, Martin Indyk, former U.S. Ambassador to Israel, said that Breaking the Silence was trying to "sensitize" Israelis to the effect of the occupation. In addition to earlier statements, in 2016 a number of retired senior Israeli security and military figures expressed support or admiration for Breaking the Silence. General Amiram Levin took out a newspaper advertisement, saying that he believed that BtS helped strengthen the IDF and its morality by providing transparency for military actions. General Ami Ayalon wrote that "Breaking the Silence protects IDF soldiers in the impossible situation in which politicians have abandoned them." Retired Israel Police Major General Alik Ron and Shin Bet security services chief Ami Ayalon jointly published an advertisement in Haaretz in support of BtS. Yuval Diskin, former head of the Shin Bet, said in 2016 that BtS helps Israel "maintain the required vigilance about the most sensitive human issues", as befitting a democratic society.

== See also ==
- Yesh Gvul
- Youth Against Dictatorship
