= Nasza =

Nasza may refer to:

- Nasza TV, was a Polish supraregional television network
- Nasza Klasa or NK.pl, a Polish school-based social networking service used by alumni and students
- NaszaKolej, a Polish government programme improving rail transport in Poland
- Nasza Księgarnia (Our Bookstore), the oldest publisher of children books in Poland

== See also ==
- Nasa (disambiguation)
- Naza
