= Yehuda Schlesinger =

Israeli journalist (born 1984)

- יהודה שלזינגר
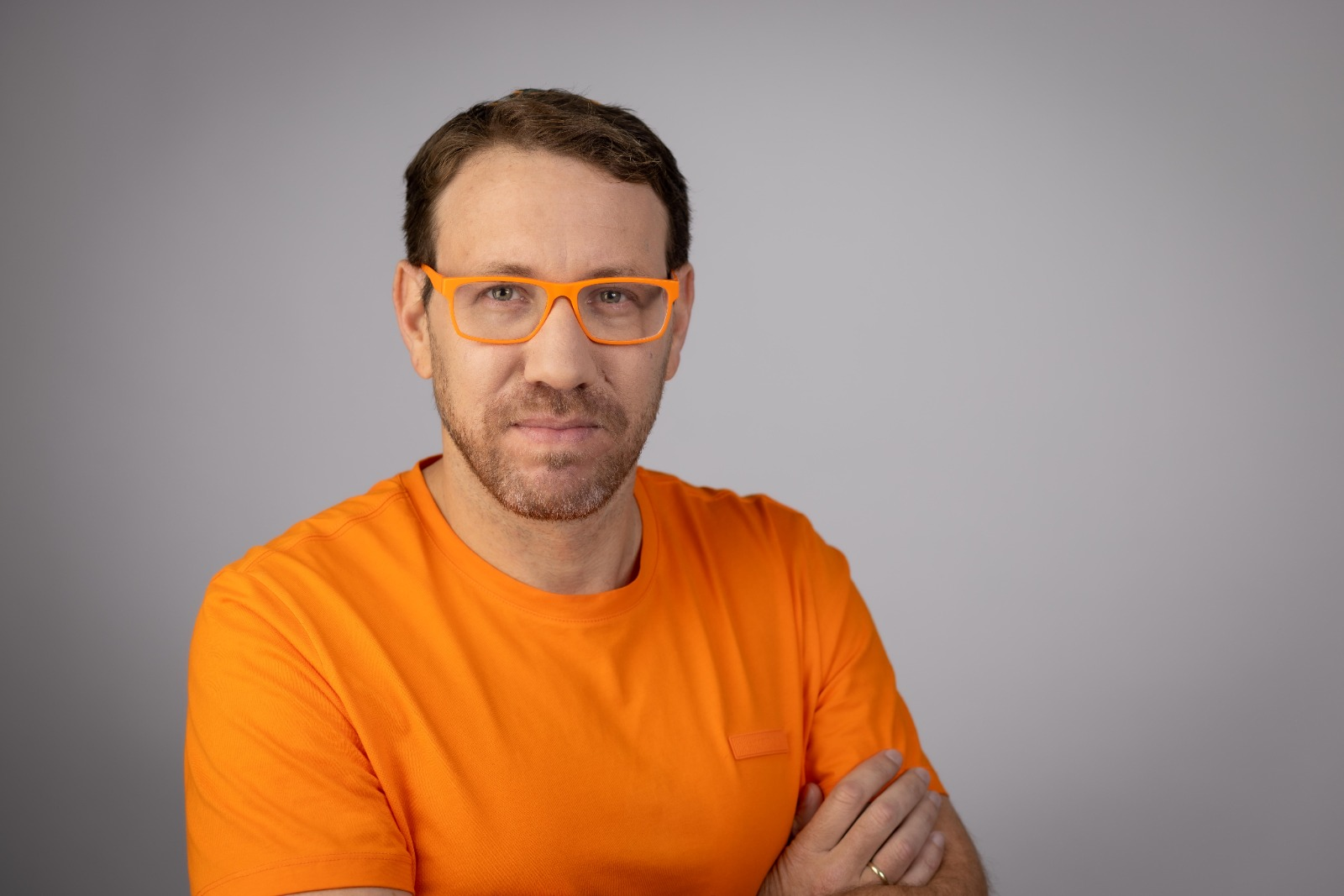
- Born: March 20, 1984 (age 42); Bnei Brak, Israel
- Education: Ono Academic College
- Occupations: Journalist, Political commentator
- Years active: 2006-

Yehuda Schlesinger (born 20 March 1984) is an Israeli journalist and political commentator currently working for Channel 14, 103fm and Israel Hayom

== Biography ==
Schlesinger was born in Bnei Brak and is the third of five siblings. He studied at a Bnei Akiva yeshiva in Bnei Brak, and then at the Beit Yatir Mechina for several months. Schlesinger then enlisted and served with the IDF Spokesperson's Unit. He then acquired a bachelor's degree in Law from Ono Academic College.

In 2006, Schlesinger joined the newspaper Israeli as a Managing editor. He moved to Israel Hayom after Israeli's closure in 2007 and became an Ultraorthodox affairs correspondent. In 2013, he formed a religious reporters Association at the paper, which he headed until 2018, when he became Israel Hayom's political correspondent.

In 2021, Schlesinger joined Channel 14, where he hosted a show called "Now on the Net", which covered social media-related news. Schlesinger then left the network in June 2022 and became a commentator on Channel 12. Schlesinger was suspended from Channel 12 in August 2024, after justifying the alleged sodomy of a detainee at Sde Teiman detention camp. He subsequently retracted his statement, while reiterating his support for the enactment of the death penalty for terrorists. Schlesinger rejoined Channel 14 in December 2024, where he hosts a night-time current events program.

Schlesinger also hosts a show on the 103fm radio station alongside journalist Barak Seri.

== Personal life ==
Schlesinger has three children and resides in Petah Tikva. He is journalist Zvika Klein's brother-in-law.

== Political views ==
In response to the documentary NAZA by Israeli filmmakers Yuval Abraham and Rachel Szor, Yehuda said that the they should be 'pursued' and 'hunted' wherever they go and encouraged Israelis to prevent them from returning to Israel. This intensified protests that occurred outside the filmmakers' homes, including their colleagues
