= Naza =

Naza may refer to:

== People ==
- Naza (artist), or Maria Nazareth Maia Rufino McFarren (born 1955), Brazilian painter
- Naza (drag queen), Brazilian drag queen
- Naza (rapper), French rapper and singer of Congolese descent
- Naza Alakija (born Nazanin Jafarian) is an activist and model
- Abdul Naza Alhassan (born 1990), Ghanaian football player

== Films ==
- NAZA (film), a 2026 documentary film directed by Yuval Abraham and Rachel Szor
- NAZA: The Real Story, a 2026 documentary film directed by Roi Danino, Ariel Averbuch, and Hagay Gutman, dubbed as the counter-film to NAZA

== Businesses ==
- Naza (company), a Malaysian business conglomerate
- Naza Automotive Manufacturing, a Malaysian automobile manufacturer

== See also ==
- NASA, the National Aeronautics and Space Administration, United States
- Nazas, a city and seat of the municipality of Nazas, in the state of Durango, north-western Mexico
