= Special Jury Prize (Venice Film Festival) =

Italian film award

- 2026 recipients: Yuval Abraham and Rachel Szor
- Location: Venice
- Country: Italy
- Presented by: Venice Film Festival
- First award: 2013
- Currently held by: Yuval Abraham and Rachel Szor for NAZA (2026)
- Website: labiennale.org/en/cinema

The Special Jury Prize is an official award given at the Venice Film Festival to one of the feature films in competition slate since 2013.

Israeli filmmakers Yuval Abraham and Rachel Szor were the most recent winners for NAZA (2026), at the 83rd Venice International Film Festival .

== History ==
German filmmaker Philip Gröning was the first winner, for The Police Officer's Wife (2013) at the 70th Venice International Film Festival. Iranian filmmaker Ana Lily Amirpour was the first woman to win the award, for The Bad Batch (2016) at the 73rd Venice International Film Festival.

Below the Clouds (2025), directed by Gianfranco Rosi, was the first documentary to win the award, at the 82nd Venice International Film Festival.

== Winners ==
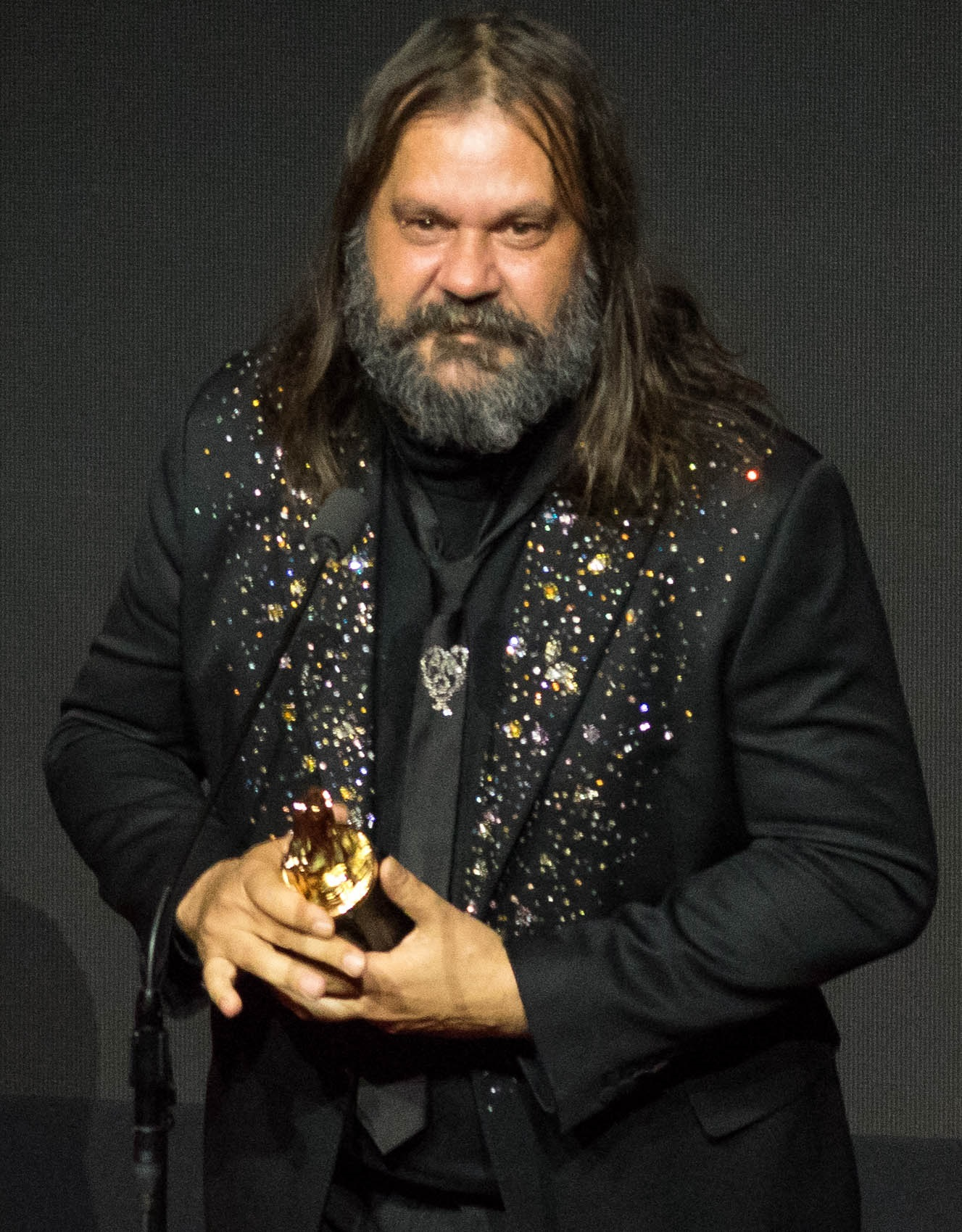
Warwick Thornton won for Sweet Country (2017)

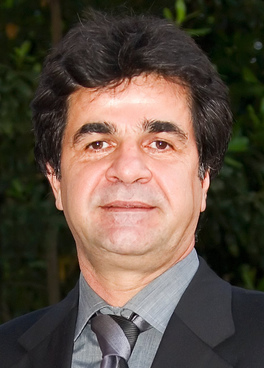
Jafar Panahi won for No Bears (2022)

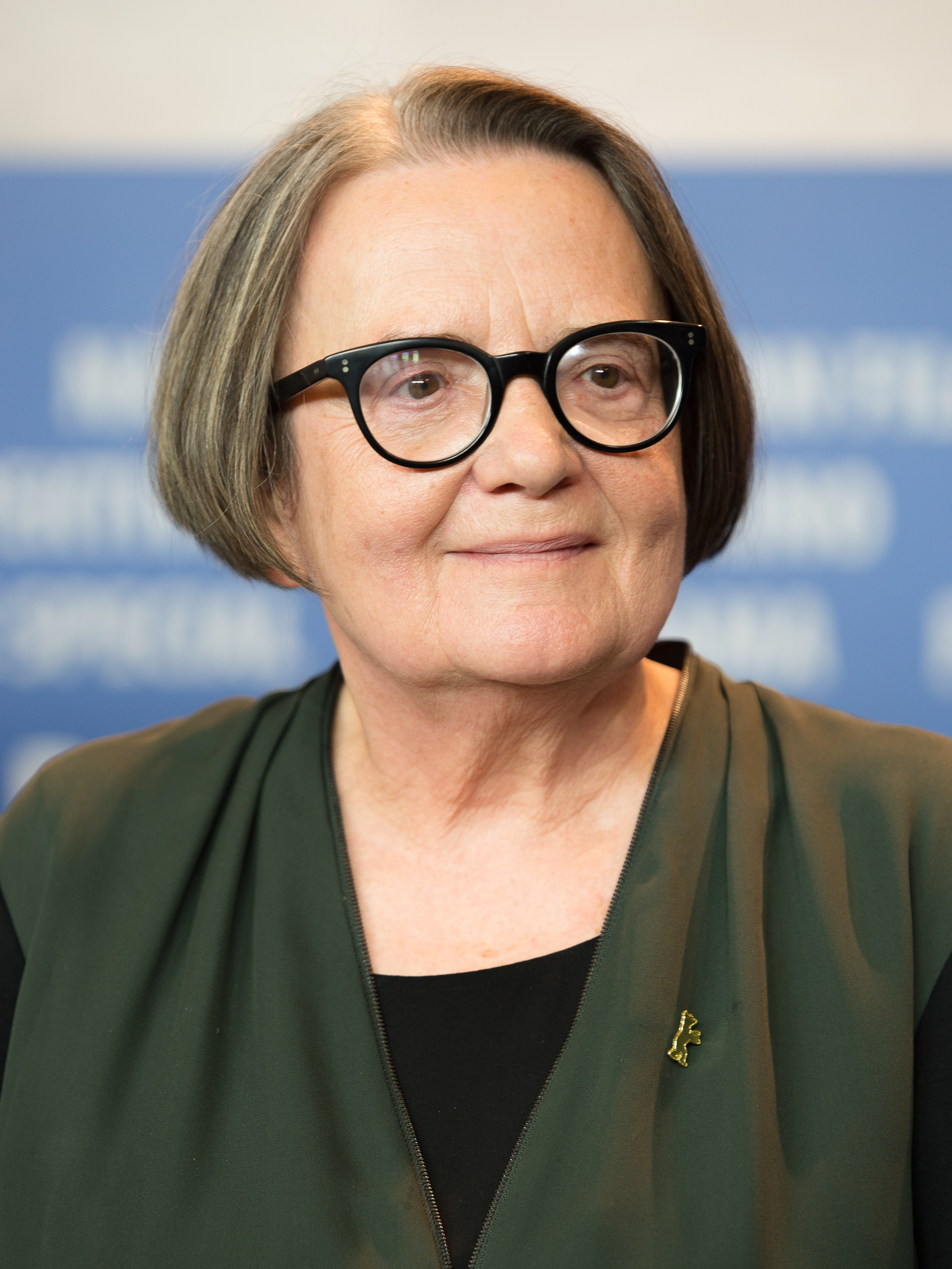
Agnieszka Holland won for Green Border (2023)

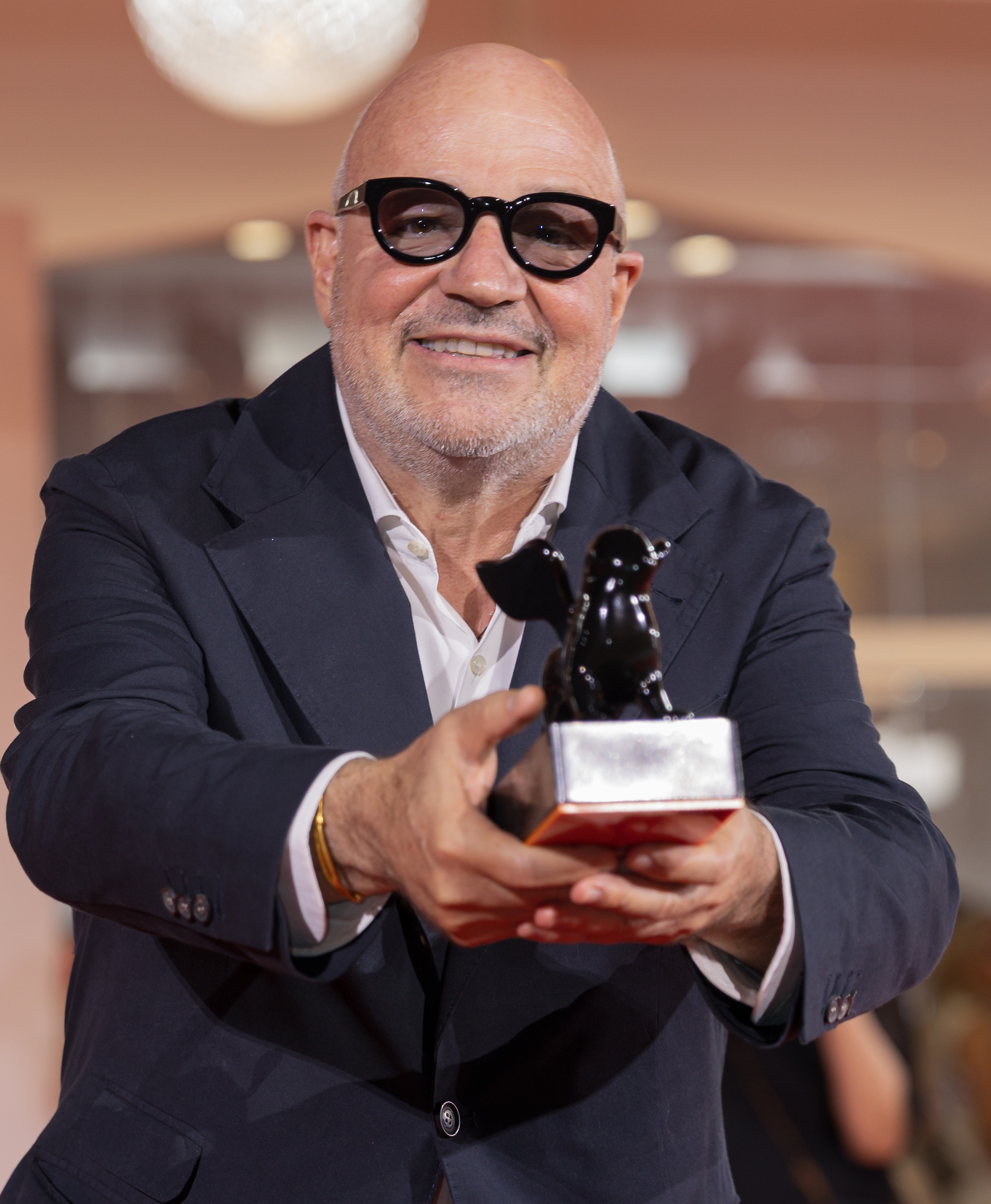
Gianfranco Rosi won for Below the Clouds (2025)

=== 2010s ===
| Year | English Title | Original Title | Director(s) | Production Country | Ref. |
|---|---|---|---|---|---|
| 2013 | The Police Officer's Wife | Die Frau des Polizisten | Philip Gröning | Germany | |
| 2014 | Sivas | | Kaan Müjdeci | Turkey, Germany | |
| 2015 | Frenzy | Abluka | Emin Alper | France, Qatar, Turkey | |
| 2016 | The Bad Batch | | Ana Lily Amirpour | United States | |
| 2017 | Sweet Country | | Warwick Thornton | Australia | |
| 2018 | The Nightingale | | Jennifer Kent | Australia | |
| 2019 | The Mafia Is No Longer What It Used to Be | La mafia non è più quella di una volta | Franco Maresco | Italy | |

=== 2020s ===
| Year | English Title | Original Title | Director(s) | Production Country | Ref. |
|---|---|---|---|---|---|
| 2020 | Dear Comrades! | Дорогие товарищи! | Andrei Konchalovsky | Russia | |
| 2021 | Il buco | | Michelangelo Frammartino | Italy, France, Germany | |
| 2022 | No Bears | خرس نیست | Jafar Panahi | Iran | |
| 2023 | Green Border | Zielona granica | Agnieszka Holland | Poland, Czech Republic, France, Belgium | |
| 2024 | April | აპრილი | Déa Kulumbegashvili | Georgia, Italy, France | |
| 2025 | Below the Clouds | Sotto le nuvole | Gianfranco Rosi | Italy | |
| 2026 | NAZA | | Yuval Abraham and Rachel Szor | United Kingdom | |

== See also ==
- Golden Lion
- Grand Jury Prize
