= Hardline =

Inflexible stance on a political issue

In politics, hardline or hard-line is an adjective describing a stance on an issue that is inflexible and not subject to compromise. A hardliner is a person holding such views. The stance is usually far from the centrist view. People, policies, and laws can be considered hardline. A hardliner may be either a reactionary or a revolutionary. Synonyms for hardliner include diehard, hawk, dove, extremist, radical, fanatic, or zealot. The term is almost always relative to the Overton window of a given time and place.

== Examples by country ==
=== France ===
The French government has taken a hardline stance against terrorism. France removed restrictions on raiding houses of suspected terrorists, although only five cases have been brought to court while over four thousand searches were conducted. Critics say the approach unfairly blames the Muslim community for radical extremists.

=== Iran ===
Ebrahim Raisi, a Shi'ite cleric and prominent politician, ran as a hardline challenger to President Rouhani in 2017 and was Rouhani's main challenger. He ran primarily on economic reforms and increasing distance with the West. He later ran again for President in 2021 and won the election by 61.9% of the popular vote (Note: Including blank/invalid votes), succeeding Rouhani, who was term-limited.

=== Russia ===
After increased sanctions by Western countries, a poll from 2016 recorded that fifty-nine percent of Russians did not want their government to change its behavior. The respondents felt that either Westerns wanted to harm Russia, hold it to standards they did not live up to, or were simply ignorant of Russian reasoning for actions.

=== United Kingdom ===
Brexit is a hardline position on relations with the European Union. The United Kingdom voted to leave the European Union to preserve its sovereignty, which was dubbed Brexit.

=== United States ===
One of the more common issues that uses hardline or hardliner as a description is illegal immigration. For example, the United States House of Representatives had two bills in June 2018 about immigration to consider: the hardline and centrist options. The House failed to pass the centrist bill. The House did not vote on the more extreme bill.

== Words implying hardline stances ==
=== Hawk ===
A hawk is someone who prefers an extreme or aggressive stance, typically on war. However, the term hawk can also be used for other issues, like deficit spending. John McCain, an American senator and 2008 presidential nominee, was considered a war hawk due to his policies on the Middle East. John R. Bolton, the national security advisor for President Trump, was also described as such.

== See also ==
- Amity–enmity complex
- Anti-normalization
- Belief perseverance
- Fundamentalism
- Groupthink
- Horseshoe theory
- Ideocracy
- Ideology
- Khartoum Resolution
- Siege mentality
- State collapse
- The Anatomy of Revolution
- The True Believer
