= Tzipi Hotovely =

Israeli politician and diplomat (born 1978)

Her Excellency Tzipi Hotovely
- ציפי חוטובלי
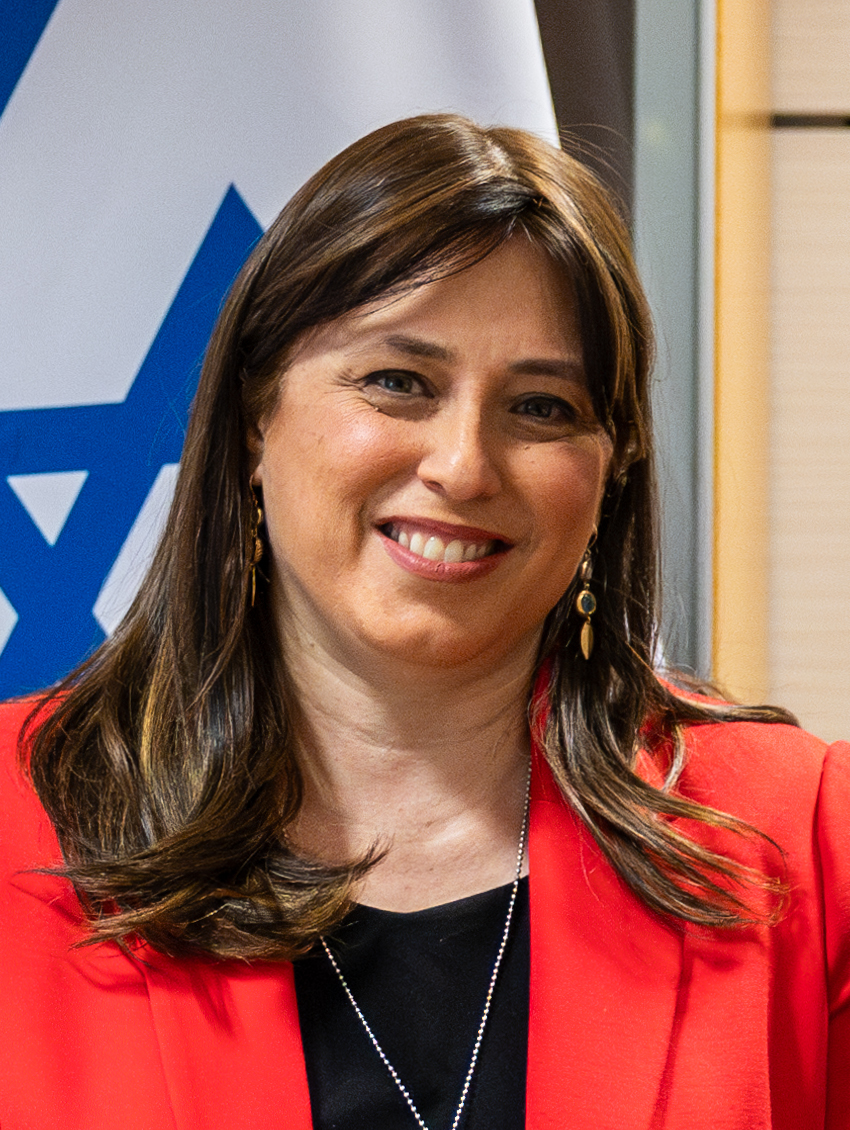
- Hotovely in 2024

Ambassador of Israel to the United Kingdom
- In office 2 August 2020 – 15 September 2025
- President: Reuven Rivlin; Isaac Herzog
- Prime Minister: Benjamin Netanyahu; Naftali Bennett; Yair Lapid
- Preceded by: Mark Regev

Minister of Settlements
- In office 1 June 2020 – 2 August 2020
- Prime Minister: Benjamin Netanyahu
- Preceded by: Tzachi Hanegbi
- Succeeded by: Orit Strook (2022)

Ministry of Diaspora Affairs and Combating Antisemitism
- In office 21 January 2020 – 17 May 2020
- Prime Minister: Benjamin Netanyahu
- Preceded by: Omer Yankelevich
- Succeeded by: Benjamin Netanyahu

Member of the Knesset
- In office 24 February 2009 – 5 July 2020

Personal details
- Born: Tzipura Hotovely; 2 December 1978 (age 47) Rehovot, Israel
- Party: Likud (since 2008)
- Spouse: Or Alon (m. 2013)
- Children: 3
- Education: Tel Aviv University; Bar-Ilan University
- Occupation: Politician, diplomat, lawyer, journalist

Tzipura "Tzipi" Hotovely (Hebrew: צפורה "ציפי" חוטובלי; born 2 December 1978) is an Israeli diplomat and politician, serving as the Head of National Public Diplomacy at the National Public Diplomacy Directorate since May 2026. She was previously the Ambassador of Israel to the United Kingdom between 2020 and 2025. She previously served as Deputy Minister of Foreign Affairs, Minister of Diaspora Affairs, Minister of Settlement Affairs, and as a member of the Knesset for the Likud party.

== Biography ==
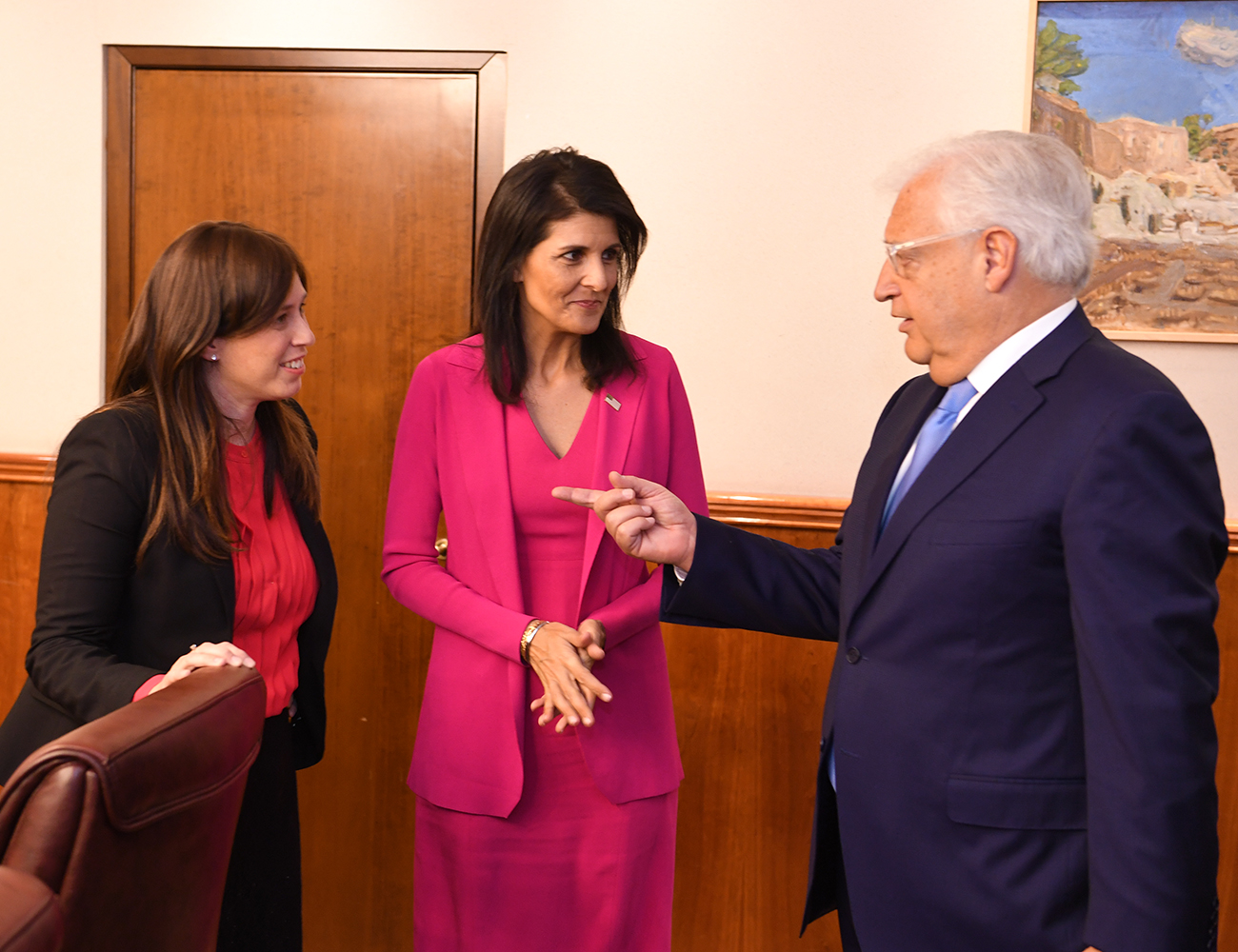
Hotovely with Nikki Haley and US Ambassador to Israel David M. Friedman in 2017

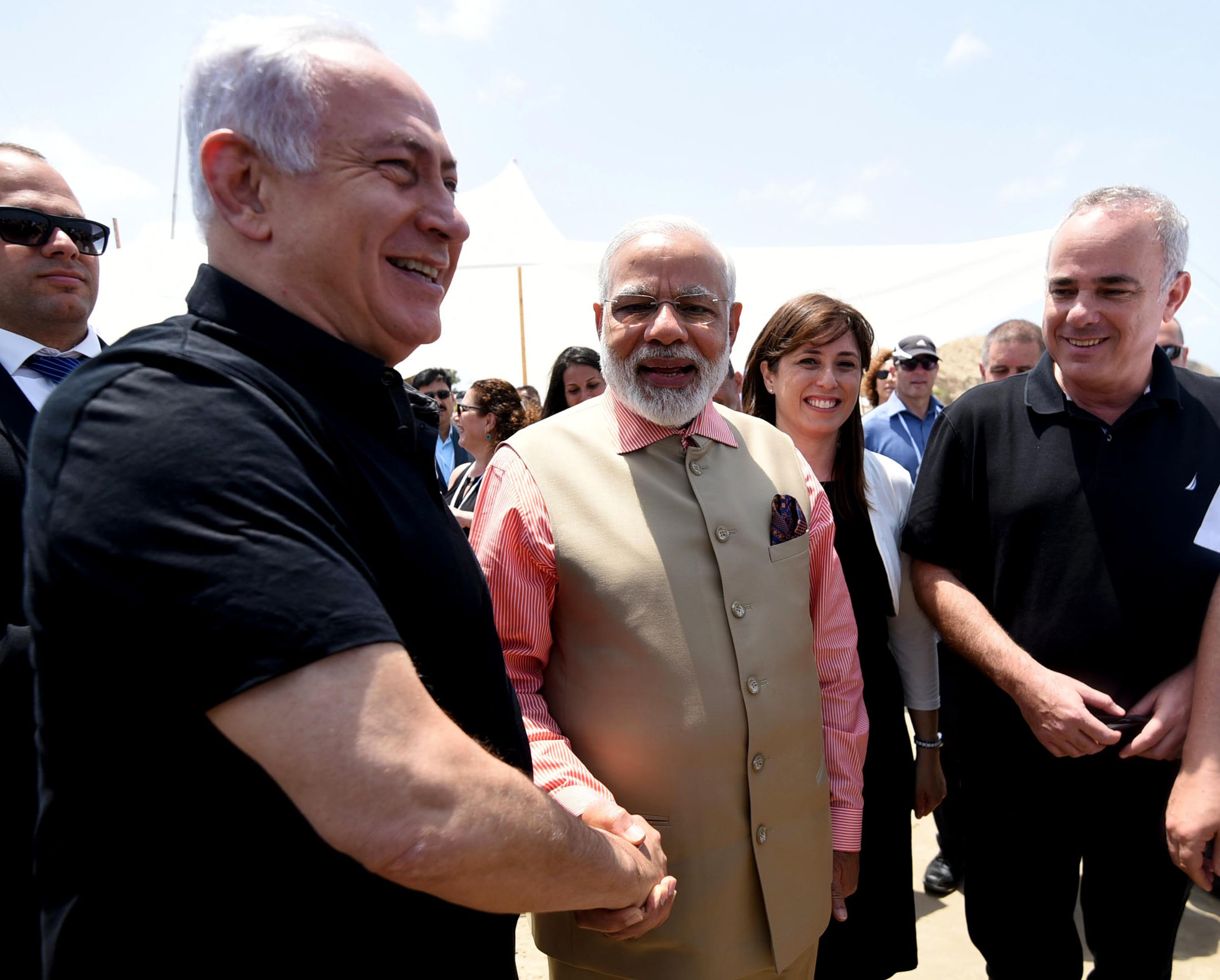
Hotovely with Israeli prime minister Benjamin Netanyahu and Indian prime minister Narendra Modi in 2017

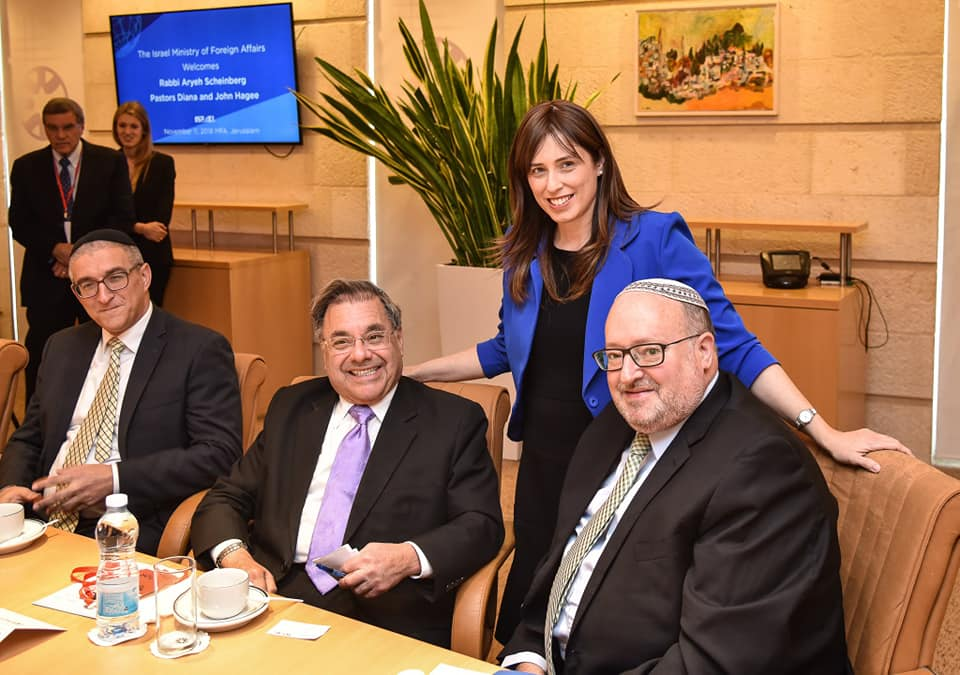
Hotovely serving as Israel's deputy minister of foreign affairs in 2018

Hotovely was born and raised in Rehovot, Israel, in a religious Jewish family. Her parents, Gabriel and Roziko Hotovely, were Georgian Jews who immigrated to Israel from the Georgian SSR before her birth. Hotovely was a doctoral student at the Faculty of Law in Tel Aviv University.

== Political career ==
On 11 November 2008, Hotovely announced that she was joining Likud, and would compete in the party's primaries for the 2009 Knesset elections. She won 18th place on the party's list, and became a member of the Knesset when Likud won 27 seats. In 2009, she was the 18th Knesset's youngest member. She chaired the Knesset Committee on the Status of Women in the 18th Knesset, before joining the government at the beginning of the 19th Knesset in 2013.

While a member of the Knesset's Committee on the State of Women and Gender Equality in 2011, she invited representatives from Lehava (Prevention of Assimilation in the Holy Land), an anti-miscegenation group whose primary objective is to oppose assimilation of Jews and which objects to any personal or business relationships between Jews and non-Jews, to a discussion of the tactics used by the organization to prevent romantic relationships between Jews and Arabs. Hotovely defended her decision at the time, saying, "it is important to me to check systems to prevent mixed marriages, and Lehava are the most suitable for this."

In March 2011, she wrote that Israeli author Amos Oz was naive, after he sent a Hamas leader a copy of his autobiography, writing that Oz would lack even the instinct to distinguish between Mordechai and Haman. In fact, Oz had sent his novel, A Tale of Love and Darkness, a work of fiction inspired by his childhood memories and not an autobiography, to the imprisoned former Tanzim leader Marwan Barghouti, Tanzim being an offshoot of Fatah, not Hamas, with a personal dedication reading: "This story is our story, I hope you read it and understand us as we understand you, hoping to see you outside and in peace, yours, Amos Oz".

In December 2011, Hotovely gained media attention by sitting at the front of a Mehadrin bus used by some Haredim, where women are asked to sit at the back of the bus.

She was re-elected in the 2013 elections, after winning fifteenth place on the joint Likud-Yisrael Beiteinu list, and was appointed Deputy Minister of Transportation and Road Safety in the new government. She was also appointed Deputy Minister of Minister of Science and Technology in December 2014, after Yaakov Peri quit as the minister. Following the 2015 elections, in which she was re-elected in twentieth place on the Likud list, she was appointed Deputy Minister of Foreign Affairs in the new government.

In July 2017, following the declaration of the Old City of Hebron as a Palestinian World Heritage Site by UNESCO, Hotovely addressed the Arab members of Knesset in a speech, holding up the book of the Tanach (The Old Testament) in one hand and the book A History of the Palestinian People in the other, saying: "I recommend to UNESCO and to the Arab Knesset members to read these two books, the Bible which tells the story of the Jewish people, and Assaf Voll's new best-seller, A History of the Palestinian People: From Ancient Times to the Modern Era. It will captivate you because it is empty. Because the Palestinians don't have kings, and they don't have heritage sites."

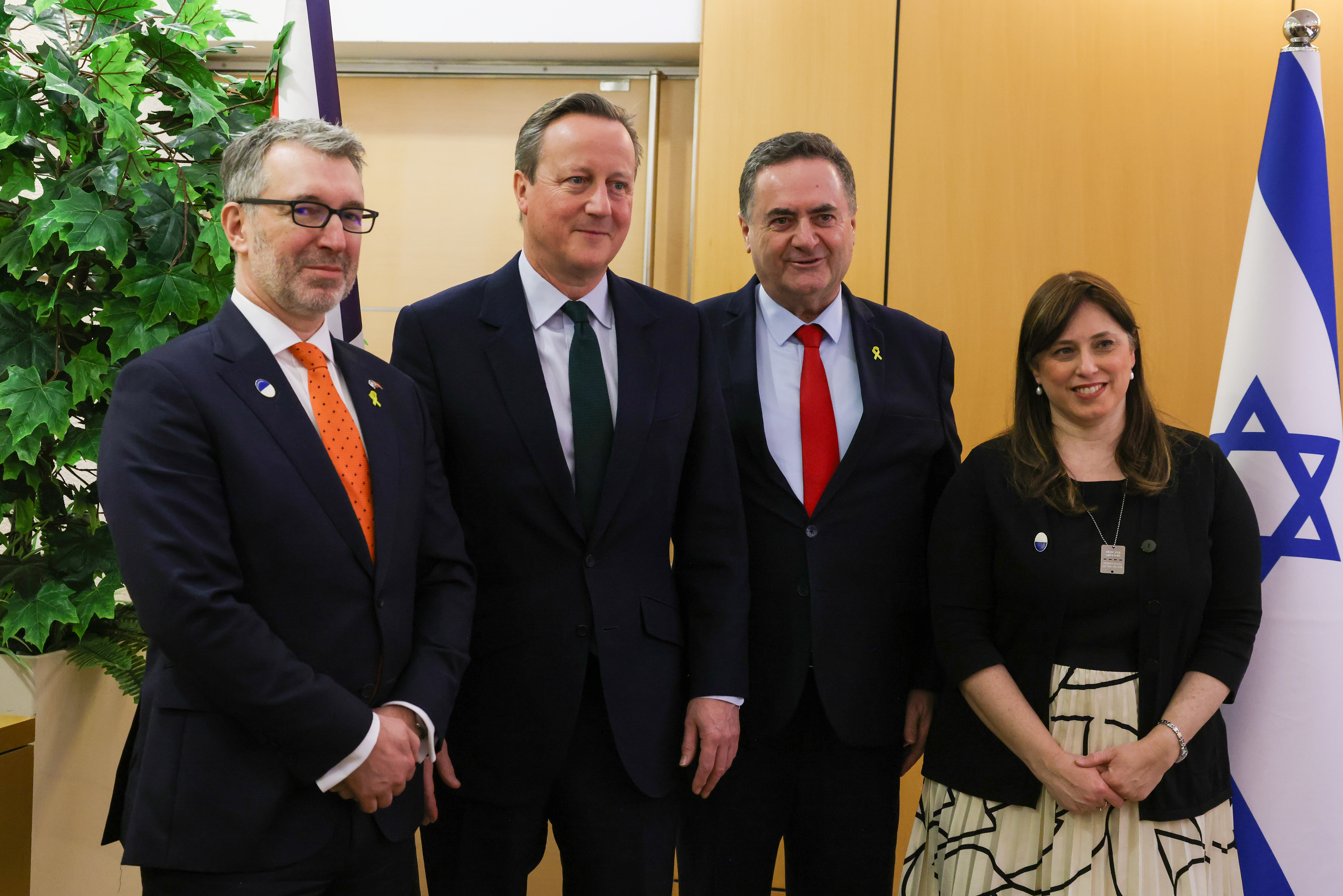
Hotovely with UK Foreign Secretary David Cameron and Israeli foreign minister Israel Katz in Jerusalem, Israel, 24 January 2024

Hotovely was nominated for Minister of Diaspora Affairs in January 2020, but her nomination was put on hold pending Knesset approval. She was later sworn in as Minister of Settlement Affairs in the new government in May 2020. In July 2020, she resigned from the Knesset under the Norwegian Law, and was replaced by Ariel Kellner. On 2 August 2020, she resigned as minister and was appointed Israeli ambassador to the United Kingdom. After the change of government in June 2021 and the Likud's transition to the opposition, newspaper Haaretz reported that Foreign Minister of Israel Yair Lapid wanted to appoint Yael German in her place, but this did not materialize.

== Views and opinions ==
Hotovely practises Orthodox Judaism, and is a self-described "religious right-winger".

In 2013, Hotovely rejected Palestinian statehood aspirations, supporting a Greater Israel spanning over the entire land of current Israel, along with the Palestinian territories. She later reiterated her position in a speech to Israeli diplomats on 22 May 2015, rejecting criticism from the international community regarding the West Bank settlement policies and saying that Israel has tried too hard to appease the world, and must stand up for itself. She said: "We need to return to the basic truth of our rights to this country." She added: "This land is ours. All of it is ours. We did not come here to apologise for that." She has also stated that she will make every effort to achieve global recognition for West Bank settlements, as well as asserting that Israel owes no apologies for its policies in the Holy Land towards the Palestinians. She justified her position as she referenced religious texts to back her belief that the Israeli-occupied West Bank belongs to the Jewish people.

In October 2015, in an interview with the Knesset Channel, Hotovely said: "It's my dream to see the Israeli flag flying on the Temple Mount." She added: "I think it's the center of Israeli sovereignty, the capital of Israel, the holiest place for the Jewish people", despite the government's insistence that it has no intention of changing the status quo at the site.

Alongside fellow politician Avraham Michaeli, Tzipi Hotovely is one of the most prominent Georgian-Jewish politicians in Israel, and takes part in events to celebrate the Georgian-Jewish community. In the Knesset, she sponsored a national authority bill to preserve and recognise the heritage of Georgian Jews.

In a 2017 interview with Israel's i24news, Hotovely said that most American Jews "don't understand the complexities of the region" (referring to the Middle East), because they "never send their children to fight for their country. Most of the Jews don't have children serving as soldiers." Hotovely's statement caused an uproar because it is false (Jewish Americans have a record of service in the armed forces), and repeated a longstanding antisemitic canard; she later issued a public apology for her statement.

In 2019, Hotovely criticised the Board of Deputies of British Jews for its support for a two-state solution; she complained that the group had not consulted "Israel's Ministry of Foreign Affairs, our ambassador, any other political authority" before publication and said that "an organization that supports the establishment of a Palestinian state is working against Israeli interests".

During the Gaza war, Hotovely has denied the Gaza genocide, alleging on several occasions that accounts of violence against Palestinian civilians are false. 10 days into the Israeli blockade of the Gaza Strip, Hotovely said “there is no humanitarian crisis”, despite UNRWA having attested to the criticality of the severe humanitarian crisis in the territory. Hotovely has denounced the British documentary on Israeli war crimes in the Gaza war NAZA as "blood libel and lies", and in October 2026 awarded certificates of appreciation "for their contribution to Israeli public diplomacy" to the directors of "NAZA: The Real Story", a propaganda film by IDF reservists made in refutation of NAZA.

=== Criticism of appointment as Ambassador to the United Kingdom ===
Several senior members of the British Jewish community criticized her appointment as Ambassador of Israel to the United Kingdom, mainly because of her "ultra-right-wing" opinions, including Melanie Phillips, Jenni Frazer, Laura Janner-Klausner, and Lord Beecham, who stated: "The appointment of an ultra-right-wing ambassador, while typical of the present government of Israel, will do nothing to win friends in the UK – or indeed any other reasonable country." A petition within the British Jewish community calling for the UK government to reject her nomination as ambassador received hundreds of signatures.

At her first event as ambassador with the Board of Deputies of British Jews in November 2021, Hotovely denied the Nakba as an "Arab lie". She had earlier sponsored in the Knesset groups deemed to be 'racist' who are opposed to mixed marriages; favours a one-state solution that withholds citizenship from West Bank Palestinians. She was strongly criticised for several of her remarks by Janner-Klausner.

In an interview with Sky News on 13 December 2023 in her capacity as Israel's ambassador to the United Kingdom, Hotovely rejected the two-state solution and expressed her opposition to the establishment of any Palestinian state. Saying "The answer is absolutely no", she went on to claim that Palestinians "want to have a state from the river to the sea". She criticised her interviewer, Mark Austin, asking him "Why are you obsessed with a formula that never worked, that created these radical people on the other side?" Her comments were rejected by the Conservative government, Labour Party, and Labour Friends of Israel. Prime Minister Rishi Sunak stated that "We don’t agree with that" and that "Our longstanding position remains the two-state solution is the right outcome here." Baroness Sayeeda Warsi called her remarks "appalling", saying "She has a long and well documented history of denying the right of Palestine to exist and is a clear example of why this Israeli government is not a partner for peace".

In January 2024, during the Gaza war, Hotovely was condemned for stating that Israeli forces would target civilian infrastructure, including schools and mosques, and destroy "the whole of Gaza" in order to neutralise Hamas' tunnel network. Labour politician Afzal Khan demanded that the government denounce Hotovely's remarks, and other critics of Israel accused her of advocating for the genocide of Palestinians. A Change.org petition calling for the removal of Hotovely as Israeli ambassador gained over 128,000 signatures.

== Personal life ==
On 27 May 2013, Hotovely married Or Alon, a lawyer, in a wedding that had 2,500 guests. She gave birth to her first daughter in 2014, to her second in 2016, and to her third in 2018.
