= NAZA: The Real Story =

2026 Israeli documentary

- Hebrew: נז"א: הסיפור האמיתי
- Directed by: Roi Danino; Ariel Averbuch; Hagai Gutman
- Release date: 30 September 2026
- Running time: 49 minutes
- Country: Israel
- Language: Hebrew

NAZA: The Real Story (Hebrew: נז"א: הסיפור האמיתי) is a 2026 Israeli documentary directed by Israel Defense Forces (IDF) reservist Lt. Col. Roi Danino, IDF reserve major Ariel Averbuch, and content creator Hagai Gutman. On 30 September 2026, it was released for free viewing online as a "counter film" to NAZA, a British documentary directed by Israeli filmmakers Yuval Abraham and Rachel Szor on the role of the IDF in the ongoing Gaza war and genocide. The film features testimony of IDF officers who reject the claims made in NAZA.

NAZA: The Real Story has been promoted and endorsed by the Office of the Prime Minister of Israel and shared by Israeli embassies worldwide. The Embassy of Israel in Washington and the filmmakers have said that neither the Israeli Ministry of Foreign Affairs nor the government of Israel had any role in the creation of the film.

== Background ==
On 10 September 2026, NAZA, a documentary written and directed by Israeli journalists Yuval Abraham and Rachel Szor, premiered at the Venice Film Festival and was received with acclaim. Abraham and Szor's documentary compiled three years of interviews with members of the IDF. The personal testimonies spoke of atrocities against Palestinian civilians in the Gaza war.

Following the success of NAZA, worldwide controversy regarding Israel erupted. The IDF denied the claims made in the film. The Israeli government launched an investigation to identify the individuals interviewed in the film, and threatened to revoke Abraham and Szor's citizenships.

NAZA: The Real Story was created by three Israelis who describe themselves as private citizens:

- Ariel Averbuch, IDF reserve major and patent attorney
- Roi Danino, IDF reserve lieutenant colonel political candidate for the right-wing Israel First party
- Hagai Gutman, film editor and director

== Production ==
Hagai Gutman made the film in 12 days. Danino and Averbuch said that the Israeli government had no role in the creation of the film and that it was entirely self-funded. The film was speedily edited and was approved by the army in a day. The film was shot in Tel Aviv, Israel and imitates many elements of the original documentary, including its nighttime rooftop environment.

== Promotion ==
The internet domain for NAZA: The Real Story (nazadocumentary.com) was registered on 16 September 2026, six days after NAZA premiered. Two redirects, whatisnaza.com and watchnaza.com, were also registered to divert users to nazadocumentary.com. Initially, the website appeared to be an official promotional page for NAZA, listing film festivals where the documentary was to be screened. When NAZA: The Real Story was released on 30 September, the website became a platform for the counter film.

Upon release, promotional material and endorsements were published on social media by the Office of the Prime Minister of Israel and Israeli embassies.

== Release ==
On 30 September, NAZA: The Real Story was released on nazadocumentary.com in Hebrew with subtitles and dubs in several languages. On 5 October, the documentary was published on their official YouTube channel.

The first U.S. screening of NAZA: The Real Story was held in New York City on 12 October 2026 at Kehilath Jeshurun on the Upper East Side of Manhattan, hosted by the Israeli-American Council (IAC). The screening was attended by Averbuch and Danino, who hosted a Q&A session moderated by pro-Israel influencer Lizzy Savetsky. In the session, Averbuch said of the film NAZA,

"I sat and watched it, and I can tell you honestly, if I didn't know the truth, I would have come out of that screening one hundred percent convinced that the Jews, the Israelis and the IDF are Nazis in every sense of the word. This film [NAZA] is set for public release in early November and tens of millions of people are expected to watch it. That's exactly why NAZA: The Real Story is a tool for all of you [because] what's coming is a tsunami of blood libels, and we have to be ready to dismantle it."

On 14 October, nazadocumentary.com was temporarily taken offline due to "anti-Zionist bots" and "radical Islamist groups" who gave false reports that the website was dangerous.

== Reception ==
Tzipi Hotovely, director of Israel’s National Public Diplomacy Directorate, awarded Danino, Averbuch, and Gutman certificates of appreciation "for their contribution to Israeli public diplomacy" for rebutting the "blood libels and lies" spread by NAZA.

Yuval Abraham, one of NAZA's directors, described NAZA: The Real Story as “a bit shady” for mimicking the title and filmmaking style of NAZA, where subjects were interviewed on rooftops at night, adding "I think it’s manipulative and you know people will search for our documentary and they will watch that other counter, giving the narrative of the military spokesperson."

A spokesperson for the British newspaper The Guardian, one of NAZA's production companies, described the film as "a brazen attempt to mislead audiences and distract from the urgent questions raised by NAZA.”

=== Viewing figures ===
On the main page of nazadocumentary.com, a counter purported to show the live view count of the documentary. On 5 October, the counter asserted the documentary had gained 20 million views. By 8 October, the counter indicated that the viewership had surpassed 42 million, which was used by Ariel Averbuch to promote the film. A discrepancy was noted between the massive numbers shown on the documentary's website and the YouTube video having had just 30,000 views at that time. When The Guardian questioned Averbuch about the origin of the 42 million figure, he said he did not know and referred the questions to his tech team. The Guardian speculated that the viewership could have been inflated by counting human or bot traffic to the website, rather than the number of actual views.

On 14 October, the viewership grew to over 44 million views. Al Jazeera launched an investigation, noting the film had received less than 130,000 views on YouTube at that time. They also reported that the film's YouTube channel had fewer than 2,000 subscribers, and the film’s account on X only had 170 followers. The website’s source code revealed that the element displaying the counter was internally tagged as "visitors" despite being claimed to be "views". However, it is also unlikely to record visitors as analytics from Semrush estimated the website had received a total of about half a million visits by 8 October. Viewing data was collected in a "watch-tracker" file after 25 seconds of watching, however it is unknown if the counter uses this information as its number is generated from the site's server, making the calculation method invisible. It was found that upon entering the website, the counter would start at 97% of its total value and increase over a three second interval, simulating what appeared to be a live counter. Al Jazeera concluded that the viewing figures used to promote the film were fabricated.
