= Below the Clouds =

2025 documentary film by Gianfranco Rosi

- Italian theatrical release poster
- Italian: Sotto le nuvole
- Directed by: Gianfranco Rosi
- Written by: Gianfranco Rosi
- Produced by: Donatella Palermo; Gianfranco Rosi; Paolo Del Brocco
- Cinematography: Gianfranco Rosi
- Edited by: Fabrizio Federico
- Music by: Daniel Blumberg
- Production companies: 21Uno Film; Stemal Entertainment; Rai Cinema
- Distributed by: 01 Distribution
- Release dates: 30 August 2025 (Venice); 18 September 2025 (Italy)
- Running time: 114 minutes
- Country: Italy
- Languages: Italian; Syrian Arabic; Japanese; Neapolitan; English
- Box office: $231,338

Below the Clouds (also known as Pompei: Below the Clouds, Italian: Sotto le nuvole) is a 2025 Italian documentary film written and directed by Gianfranco Rosi. An homage to the city of Naples, it is Rosi's third documentary about everyday life in Italy, following 2013's Sacro GRA (about the outskirts of Rome) and 2016's Fire at Sea (about the island of Lampedusa).

The film had its world premiere in the main competition of the 82nd Venice International Film Festival on 30 August 2025, where it won the Special Jury Prize. It was theatrically released in Italy by 01 Distribution on 18 September.

== Premise ==
A portrait of the city of Naples, the film presents fragments of the daily lives of the people who live and work in the city.

== Production ==
The film was shot in and around Naples over three years. It is Rosi's first black-and-white documentary feature in over thirty years, following Boatman (1993) about the Ganges river in India. Academy Award winner Daniel Blumberg provided the musical score for the documentary, marking his first collaboration with Rosi.

== Release ==
The Match Factory owns the international sales rights to the film. A trailer was released on 22 July 2025. The film premiered in the main competition of the 82nd Venice International Film Festival. It was screened at the BFI London Film Festival. It competed in Stockholm Documentary Competition of the 2025 Stockholm International Film Festival on 14 November.

It was theatrically released in Italy by 01 Distribution on 18 September 2025.

Mubi handles the distribution rights to the film in North and Latin America, the United Kingdom, Ireland, Germany, Austria, Switzerland, Spain, Turkey, India, Australia and New Zealand, and will give it an awards-qualifying run in the fall of 2025, followed by a theatrical release sometime in the first quarter of 2026.

== Reception ==
=== Critical response ===
On the review aggregator website Rotten Tomatoes, 98% of 43 critics' reviews are positive, with an average rating of 8/10. The website's consensus reads: "Guided by Gianfranco Rosi's eloquent directorial hand, Pompei: Below the Clouds captures life in a fragile, volcano-shadowed city with a deeply evocative, surprisingly hopeful cinematic mosaic."

Sheila O'Malley of RogerEbert.com gave the film four stars out of four and wrote that it's "gorgeous". Peter Bradshaw of The Guardian rated the film five stars out of five, calling it "utterly distinctive" and "a ghostly yet luminous cinematic mosaic".

=== Accolades ===
Award	Date of ceremony	Category	Recipient(s)	Result	Ref.
Venice Film Festival	6 September 2025	Golden Lion	Gianfranco Rosi	Nominated	
Venice Film Festival	6 September 2025	Special Jury Prize	Gianfranco Rosi	Won	
Venice Film Festival	6 September 2025	Premio Fondazione Fai Persona Lavoro Ambiente – Special Mention	Gianfranco Rosi	Won	
Valladolid International Film Festival	1 November 2025	Golden Spike	Below the Clouds	Nominated	
Stockholm International Film Festival	14 November 2025	Best Documentary	Below the Clouds	Nominated	
