= James Wilson (producer) =

British film producer

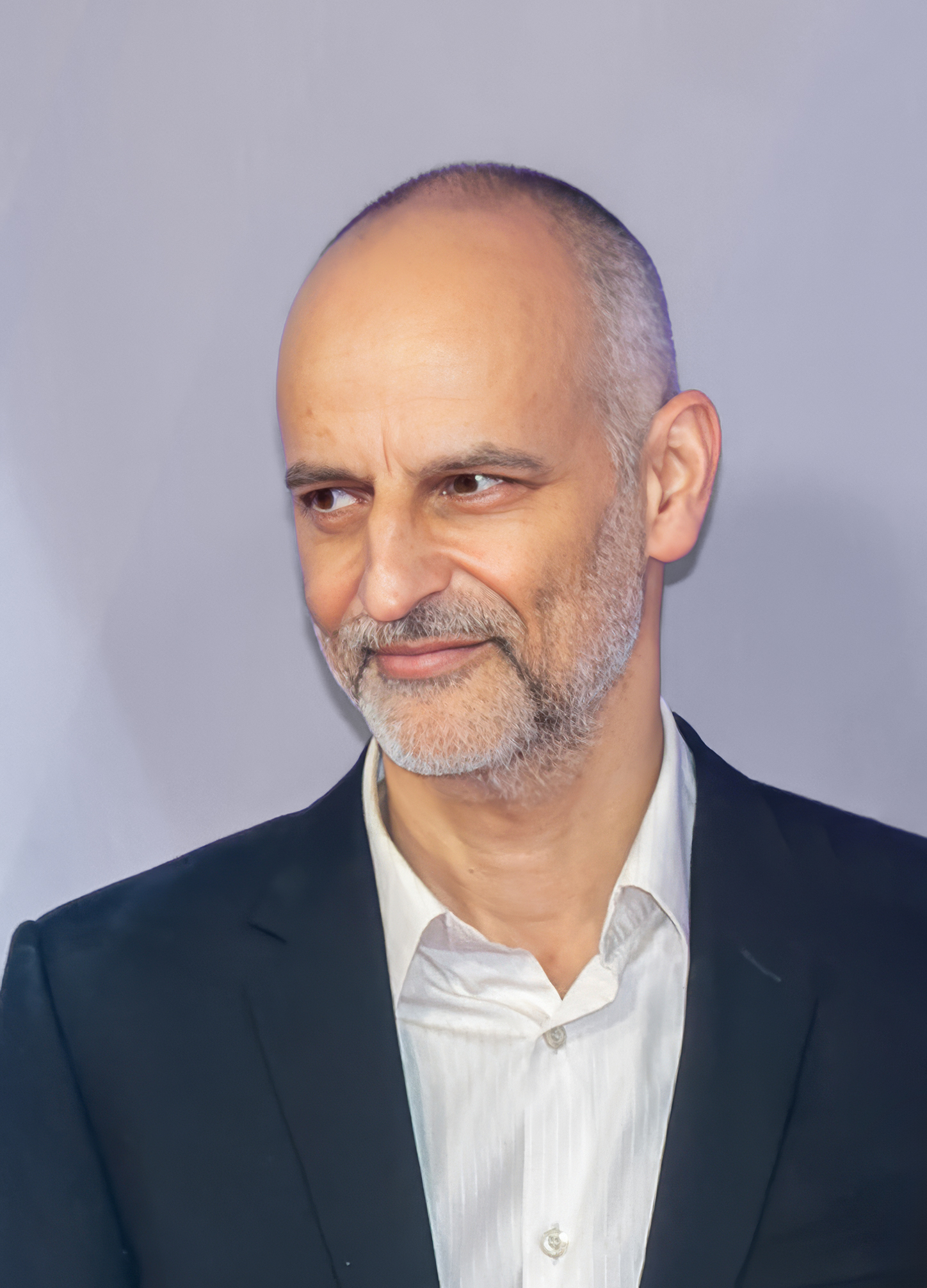
- Wilson in 2023
- Born: James Lewis Wilson
- Education: American Film Institute
- Occupation: Film producer
- Years active: 2001–present

James Wilson is a British film producer. He won two British Academy Film Awards and was nominated for two more in the categories Best Film Not in the English Language and Outstanding British Film for the films Under the Skin, You Were Never Really Here and The Zone of Interest. He was also nominated for an Academy Award for Best Picture for the latter.

Wilson has been a long-term collaborator of film director and screenwriter Jonathan Glazer.

== Filmography ==
=== Producer ===
Year	Title	Director	Notes
2005	The King	James Marsh	
2011	Attack the Block	Joe Cornish	
2012	The Pervert's Guide to Ideology	Sophie Fiennes	
2013	Under the Skin	Jonathan Glazer	
2014	20,000 Days on Earth	Iain Forsyth and Jane Pollard	
2016	One More Time with Feeling	Andrew Dominik	
2017	You Were Never Really Here	Lynne Ramsay	
2019	A Dog Called Money	Seamus Murphy	
2019	Waves	Trey Edward Shults	
2023	The Zone of Interest	Jonathan Glazer	
2025	The Voice of Hind Rajab	Kaouther Ben Hania	
2025	Hamlet	Aneil Karia	
2026	NAZA	Yuval Abraham and Rachel Szor	

=== Executive producer ===
Year	Title	Director	Notes
2001	Buffalo Soldiers	Gregor Jordan	Co-executive producer
2003	It's All About Love	Thomas Vinterberg	Co-executive producer
2004	Shaun of the Dead	Edgar Wright	
2009	The Lovely Bones	Peter Jackson	
2017	Grace Jones: Bloodlight and Bami	Sophie Fiennes	
2022	Stutz	Jonah Hill	
2023	Earth Mama	Savanah Leaf	

== See also ==
- List of Academy Award winners and nominees from Great Britain
