= No Other Land =

2024 Palestinian-Norwegian documentary film

- International promotional poster
- Arabic: لا أرض أخرى
- Directed by: Basel Adra; Hamdan Ballal; Yuval Abraham; Rachel Szor
- Written by: Basel Adra; Hamdan Ballal; Yuval Abraham; Rachel Szor
- Produced by: Fabien Greenberg; Bård Kjøge Rønning
- Starring: Basel Adra; Yuval Abraham
- Cinematography: Rachel Szor
- Edited by: Basel Adra; Hamdan Ballal; Yuval Abraham; Rachel Szor
- Music by: Julius Pollux Rothlaender
- Production companies: Yabayay Media; Antipode films
- Release date: 16 February 2024 (Berlinale)
- Running time: 92 minutes
- Countries: Palestine; Norway
- Languages: Arabic; Hebrew; English
- Box office: $4.0 million

No Other Land (Arabic: لا أرض أخرى, romanized: Lā arḍ ukhrá) is a 2024 documentary film directed by Basel Adra, Hamdan Ballal, Yuval Abraham, and Rachel Szor, in their directorial debut. A Palestinian-Israeli collective of activists, the four conceived and produced the film in what they describe as an act of resistance on the path to justice in the Israeli–Palestinian conflict. The film was recorded between 2019 and 2023 and shows the destruction of Masafer Yatta, a Palestinian community in the occupied West Bank, which had been resisting forced displacement after an Israeli "firing zone" was declared on their land.

A co-production between Palestine and Norway, the film was selected for the Panorama section at the 74th Berlin International Film Festival, where it had its world premiere on 16 February 2024, winning the Panorama Audience Award for Best Documentary Film and the Berlinale Documentary Film Award. The film also won the Academy Award for Best Documentary Feature Film at the 97th Academy Awards.

== Synopsis ==
Basel Adra, a young Palestinian activist, has been resisting the forced displacement of his people by Israel's military in Masafer Yatta, a region in the occupied West Bank, since he was a child. He records the gradual destruction of his homeland, where Israeli soldiers are tearing down homes and evicting their inhabitants to enforce a court order maintaining that the area's designation as an Israeli military firing zone was legal under Israeli law. He befriends Yuval Abraham, a Jewish Israeli journalist who helps him in his struggle. They form an unexpected bond, but their friendship is challenged by the huge gap between their living conditions: Adra faces constant oppression and violence, while Abraham enjoys freedom and security.

The film follows Adra and the residents of Masafer Yatta as they confront Israeli forces carrying out demolition orders. During one such confrontation, Masafer Yatta resident Harun Abu Aram is shot by an Israeli soldier and paralyzed from the neck down while trying to prevent them from stealing his electric generator. Due to the destruction of his home, which was illegal under Israeli law, he is forced to live in a cave. Abu Aram eventually dies as a result of his injuries and inability to receive proper care.

Abraham attempts to raise awareness of the situation in Masafer Yatta, with limited results. Adra chides him for wanting results too quickly and tells Abraham to be patient. Adra ponders the limits of raising awareness, rhetorically asking Abraham what will happen after people see the footage they have captured. The film ends by showing Adra's cousin Zakaria al-Adra, who was unarmed, being shot by an Israeli settler in the days following the October 7 attacks.

== Production ==
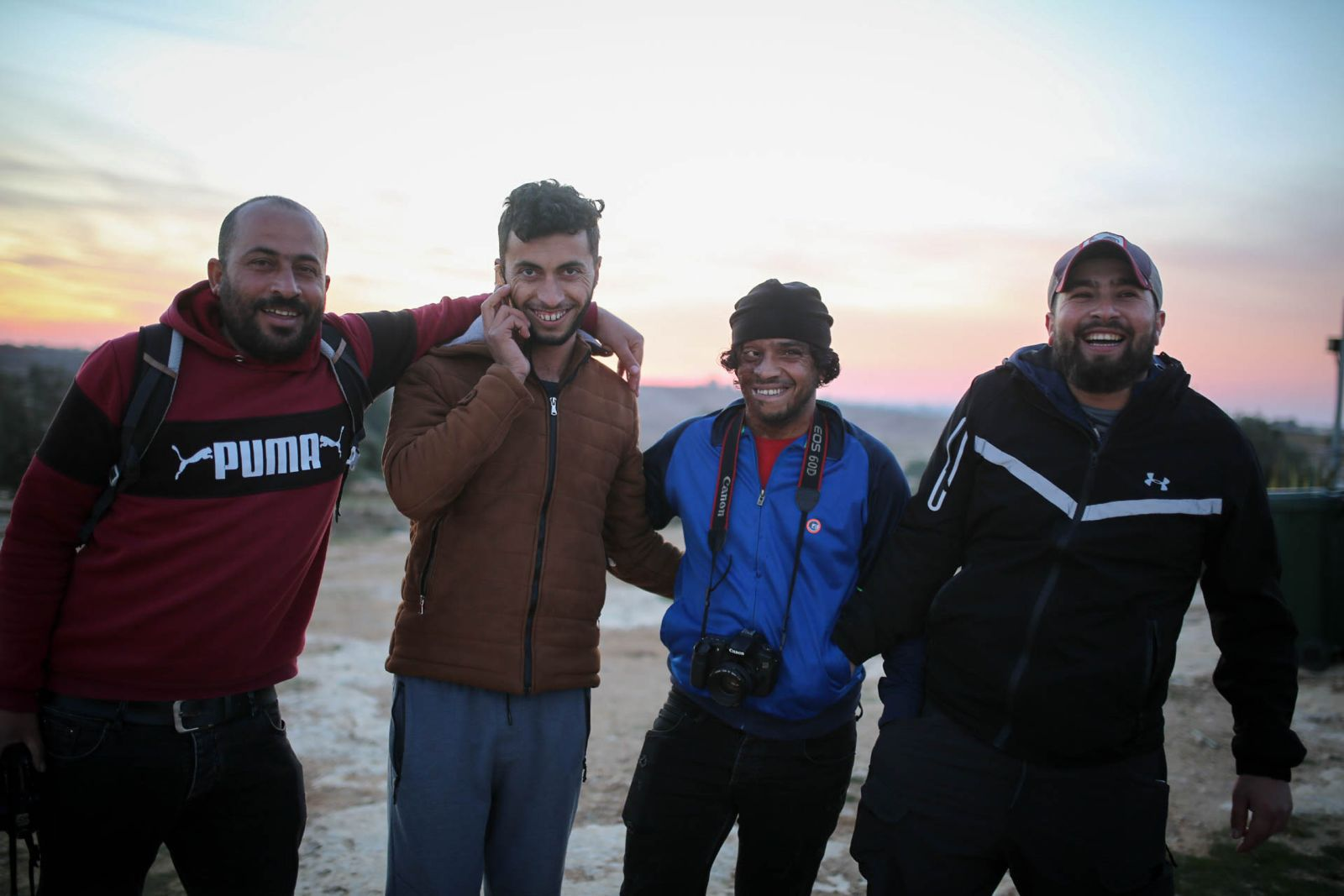
Left to right: Hamdan Ballal and Basel Adra, co-directors of No Other Land, pictured with Awdah Hathaleen and Ali Awad in 2021

In an interview at the Berlinale, Adra and Abraham spoke with Variety about the film. Adra said of its development, "Yuval and Rachel, who are Israelis, came five years ago to write about things—Yuval is journalist. We met and we became friends but also activists together, working on articles about the area. [...] And then we got the idea of doing this, of creating this movie." Abraham said:

Basal's [sic] family and neighbors had a huge archive of videos that were filmed over the course of 20 years. And then we as activists, we were there on the ground together, working together for almost five years, and we filmed a lot. We had Rachel, the cinematographer and co-director of the film, who was shooting us. So there was an abundance of footage. The military entered Basal's [sic] home twice and confiscated computers and cameras. So we were always very, very stressed. It was complicated logistically and quite stressful, but in the end we managed.

The documentary was filmed from 2019 to 2023, wrapping in October 2023.

== Release ==
=== Film festivals ===
No Other Land had its world premiere on 16 February 2024, as part of the 74th Berlin International Film Festival, in Panorama. It had its international premiere in the "Urgent Matters" section and the "Conflicted" theme at the Copenhagen International Documentary Film Festival on 15 March 2024. It featured in the "Popular Front(s)" in the 46th Cinéma du Réel Festival in March 2024 in Paris. The film was presented in the International Documentaries section of the 71st Sydney Film Festival on 13 June 2024. It screened in the "Horizons" section at the 58th Karlovy Vary International Film Festival on 28 June 2024.

No Other Land was selected in TIFF Docs at the 2024 Toronto International Film Festival, where it screened on 12 September 2024. It screened in "Showcase" at the 2024 Vancouver International Film Festival on 28 September 2024. It was selected in Documentary Showcase at the 29th Busan International Film Festival and screened on 3 October 2024. It was on the Main Slate of the 2024 New York Film Festival and screened at Lincoln Center in October 2024. It screened at the Adelaide Film Festival in October 2024. The film was selected for the MAMI Mumbai Film Festival 2024 under the World Cinema section, where it was to have its South Asia premiere, but its screenings were canceled as the festival could not obtain "required permissions" in time. The film was also selected in the Standpoint section of the 35th Singapore International Film Festival and screened there on 4 December 2024.

=== Theatrical release ===
No Other Land was picked up for distribution in 24 countries, but could not find a U.S. distributor, a situation that has been called soft censorship. It had a one-week Oscar-qualifying theatrical run at Film at Lincoln Center in New York City starting on 1 November 2024. It had a limited theatrical release on 31 January 2025 at Film Forum in New York City and on 7 February at Laemmle Theatres in Los Angeles, with bookings facilitated by Cinetic Media via Michael Tuckman Media. The film was released in UK cinemas, distributed by Dogwoof, in November 2024, and in Australian cinemas on 2 December 2024.

=== Streaming and digital release ===
The film was released on the subscription service DocPlay in Australia on 24 February 2025. In March 2025 it was streamed on Channel 4's service All4 and screened on its free-to-air channel. As of 2026 the film is available on DocPlay and the Australian free public broadcaster streaming platform SBS on Demand. In April 2025, the film was made available for digital rental in North America for three weeks, with proceeds benefiting Masafer Yatta. The film was made available on streaming platforms in the US on 20 October 2025. The filmmakers said they had previously reached a streaming agreement with Mubi but declined the deal due to Sequoia Capital's investment in Mubi. The film is available to rent on Apple TV, YouTube, Amazon Prime Video, and other services via the fundraising platform, with proceeds going directly to the people of Masafer Yatta.

== Reception ==
=== Critical response ===
On the review aggregator website Rotten Tomatoes, 100% of 105 critics' reviews are positive, with an average rating of 8.9/10. The website's consensus reads: "An elegantly assembled diary of the Palestinian experience, No Other Land is a harrowing document that leaves traces of hope for a better future." Metacritic, which uses a weighted average, assigned the film a score of 93 out of 100, based on 24 critics, indicating "universal acclaim".

Olivia Popp, reviewing the film at Berlinale for Cineuropa, wrote: "No Other Land is at its best when it achieves cinematographic mobility, the camera acting as an extension of this activist interrogation of violent Israeli occupation and not as a detached observer." Lovia Gyarkye, reviewing the film for The Hollywood Reporter, called it "a devastating portrait", writing, "The film is not a document of solutions, but it does position itself as a step in the movement toward a future where Palestinians are just as free as Israelis." Jonathan Romney, reviewing the film at Berlinale in ScreenDaily, called the film "a documentary that is particularly urgent and eye-opening in the context of the current Israeli–Palestinian conflict."

In Variety, Guy Lodge wrote, "Given the conditions of its production, No Other Land would be vital even in a more ragged form. But the filmmaking here is tight and considered." David Ehrlich of IndieWire graded the film A and wrote, "The footage is out there, and it's rarely been assembled into a more concise, powerful, and damning array than it is here. Now it only has to be seen." For RogerEbert.com, Robert Daniels wrote, "In the hands of these filmmakers the camera becomes a weapon for truth and resistance, and a tool for conservation—recording some proof that their village existed".

=== Accolades ===
The film was ranked third among the top 25 European works of 2024 by the journalists at Cineuropa. It was included on Screen International's list of top documentaries of 2024 and on Deadline Hollywood's top 10 documentaries of 2024. In June 2025, IndieWire placed the film 13th on its list of "The 100 Best Movies of the 2020s (So Far, midway of the decade)".

Award	Date	Category	Recipient(s)	Result	Ref.
Berlin International Film Festival	25 February 2024	Panorama Audience Award for Best Documentary Film	No Other Land	Won	
Berlin International Film Festival	25 February 2024	Berlinale Documentary Film Award	No Other Land	Won	
Copenhagen International Documentary Film Festival	22 March 2024	Audience Award	No Other Land	Won	
Visions du Réel	19 April 2024	Audience Award	No Other Land	Won	
Millennium Docs Against Gravity	16 May 2024	Grand Prix Bank Millennium Award	No Other Land	Won	
Millennium Docs Against Gravity	16 May 2024	Audience Award	No Other Land	Won	
Vancouver International Film Festival	6 October 2024	Audience Award – Showcase	No Other Land	Won	
Busan International Film Festival	11 October 2024	Busan Cinephile Award	No Other Land	Won	
Chicago International Film Festival	27 October 2024	Gold Hugo – Documentary Competition	No Other Land	Nominated	
Asia Pacific Screen Awards	30 November 2024	Best Documentary Film	Yuval Abraham, Basel Adra, Hamdan Ballal, Rachel Szor, Fabien Greenberg, Bård Kjøge Rønning	Won	
Montreal International Documentary Festival	1 December 2024	People's Choice Award (Prix du Public)	Yuval Abraham, Basel Adra, Hamdan Ballal, Rachel Szor, Fabien Greenberg, Bård Kjøge Rønning	Won	
Gotham Awards	2 December 2024	Best Documentary Feature	Yuval Abraham, Basel Adra, Hamdan Ballal, Rachel Szor, Fabien Greenberg, Bård Kjøge Rønning	Won	
New York Film Critics Circle	3 December 2024	Best Non-Fiction Film	No Other Land	Won	
National Board of Review Awards	5 December 2024	NBR Freedom of Expression Award	No Other Land	Won	
International Documentary Association Awards	5 December 2024	Best Feature Documentary	Yuval Abraham, Basel Adra, Hamdan Ballal, Rachel Szor, Fabien Greenberg, Bård Kjøge Rønning	Won	
International Documentary Association Awards	5 December 2024	Best Director	Basel Adra, Hamdan Ballal, Rachel Szor, and Yuval Abraham	Won	
International Documentary Association Awards	5 December 2024	Courage Under Fire Award	Basel Adra, Hamdan Ballal, Rachel Szor, and Yuval Abraham	Won	
European Film Awards	7 December 2024	European Film	No Other Land	Shortlisted	
European Film Awards	7 December 2024	European Documentary	No Other Land	Won	
British Independent Film Awards	8 December 2024	Best International Independent Film	Basel Adra, Rachel Szor, Hamdan Ballal, Yuval Abraham, Fabrien Greenberg, Bård Kjøge Rønning	Nominated	
Boston Society of Film Critics	8 December 2024	Best Documentary Film	No Other Land	Won	
Washington D.C. Area Film Critics Association	8 December 2024	Best Documentary	No Other Land	Nominated	
Los Angeles Film Critics Association	8 December 2024	Best Documentary Film	No Other Land	Won	
San Diego Film Critics Society	9 December 2024	Best Foreign Language Film	No Other Land	Nominated	
St. Louis Film Critics Association	15 December 2024	Best Documentary Feature	No Other Land	Won	
Toronto Film Critics Association	15 December 2024	Special Citation	No Other Land	Won	
Seattle Film Critics Society	16 December 2024	Best Documentary Feature	Basel Adra, Hamdan Ballal, Yuval Abraham, and Rachel Szor	Won	
Chicago Film Critics Association	11 December 2024	Best Documentary Film	No Other Land	Won	
Film Comment	12 December 2024	Top 20 Best Films of 2024	No Other Land	4th place	
Film Comment	13 December 2024	Best Undistributed Film	No Other Land	Won	
San Francisco Bay Area Film Critics Circle	15 December 2024	Best Documentary Feature	No Other Land	Nominated	
Florida Film Critics Circle	20 December 2024	Best Documentary Film	No Other Land	Nominated	
Greater Western New York Film Critics Association	4 January 2025	Best Picture	No Other Land	Nominated	
Greater Western New York Film Critics Association	4 January 2025	Best Foreign Film	No Other Land	Won	
Greater Western New York Film Critics Association	4 January 2025	Best Documentary	Yuval Abraham, Basel Adra, Hamdan Ballal, Rachel Szor	Won	
National Society of Film Critics	4 January 2025	Best Non-Fiction Film	No Other Land	Won	
National Society of Film Critics	4 January 2025	Special Citation for a Film Awaiting U.S. Distribution	No Other Land	Won	
Austin Film Critics Association	6 January 2025	Best Documentary Film	No Other Land	Nominated	
Cinema Eye Honors	9 January 2025	Outstanding Non-Fiction Feature	Yuval Abraham, Basel Adra, Hamdan Ballal, Rachel Szor, Fabien Greenberg, Bård Kjøge Rønning, Julius Pollux Rothlaender and Bård Harazi Farbu	Won	
Cinema Eye Honors	9 January 2025	Outstanding Direction	Yuval Abraham, Basel Adra, Hamdan Ballal, Rachel Szor	Nominated	
Cinema Eye Honors	9 January 2025	Outstanding Debut	Yuval Abraham, Basel Adra, Hamdan Ballal, Rachel Szor	Won	
Cinema Eye Honors	9 January 2025	Outstanding Production	Fabien Greenberg and Bård Kjøge Rønning	Nominated	
Cinema Eye Honors	9 January 2025	The Unforgettables	Yuval Abraham and Basel Adra	Won	
Palm Springs International Film Festival	12 January 2025	Best Documentary	No Other Land	Won	
Satellite Awards	26 January 2025	Best Motion Picture – Documentary	No Other Land	Nominated	
Robert Awards	1 February 2025	Best Non-English Language Film	No Other Land	Nominated	
London Film Critics' Circle	2 February 2025	Documentary of the Year	No Other Land	Won	
International Cinephile Society	9 February 2025	Best Documentary	No Other Land	Runner-up	
International Cinephile Society	9 February 2025	Best Debut Film	No Other Land	Nominated	
British Academy Film Awards	16 February 2025	Best Documentary	Yuval Abraham, Basel Adra, Hamdan Ballal, Rachel Szor	Nominated	
Academy Awards	2 March 2025	Best Documentary Feature Film	Yuval Abraham, Basel Adra, Hamdan Ballal, Rachel Szor	Won	

=== Criticisms and concerns ===
The film was condemned by both Israeli officials and the Boycott, Divestment and Sanctions (BDS) movement, for starkly different reasons.

==== Berlinale ====
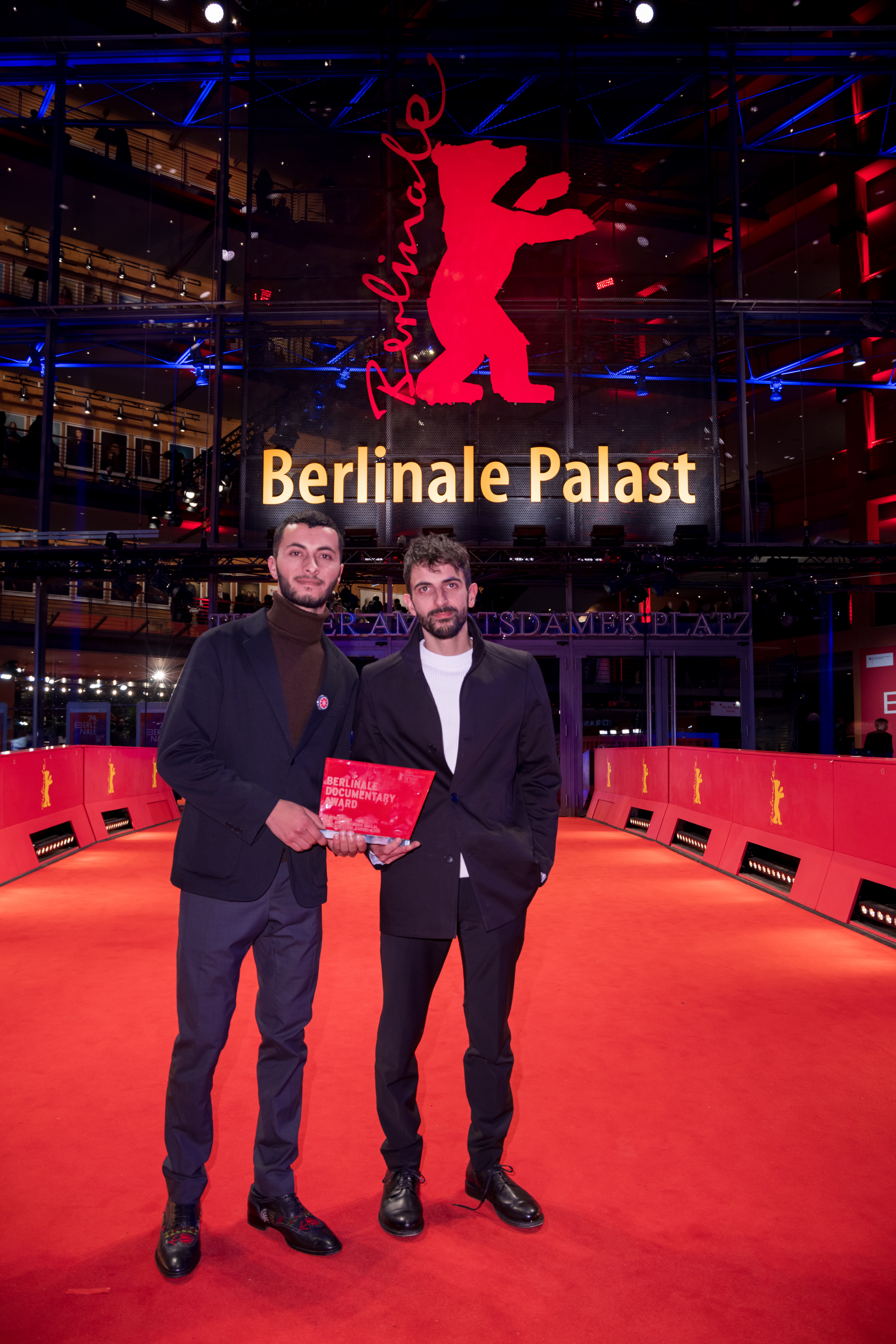
Basel Adra and Yuval Abraham holding their Berlinale Documentary Award

At the 74th Berlin International Film Festival, No Other Land won the Berlinale Documentary Award and the Panorama Audience Award for Best Documentary Film. During his acceptance speech for the Berlinale Documentary Award, Abraham criticized Israel, saying:

We are standing in front of you now—me and Basel are the same age. I am Israeli; Basel is Palestinian. And in two days we will go back to a land where we are not equal. I am living under a civilian law and Basel is under military law. We live 30 minutes from one another, but I have voting rights; Basel is not having voting rights. I'm free to move where I want in this land; Basel is, like millions of Palestinians, locked in the occupied West Bank. This situation of apartheid between us, this inequality, it has to end.

In his acceptance speech, Adra said:

It's our first movie since many years. My community, my family has been filming our community being erased by this brutal occupation. I am here celebrating the award, but also very hard for me to celebrate when there are tens of thousands of my people being slaughtered and massacred by Israel in Gaza. Masafer Yatta, my community, is being also razed by Israeli bulldozers. I ask one thing: for Germany, as I am in Berlin here, to respect the U.N. calls and stop sending weapons to Israel.

There were numerous pro-Palestine protests during the acceptance speeches and on the red carpet at the Berlinale—including from Golden Bear winner Mati Diop. After the closing ceremony on 25 February 2024, an Instagram account linked to the Panorama section published an allegedly official statement from the festival organizers, demanding German authorities to withdraw arms supplies to Israel. Shortly afterward, the Berlinale's main Instagram account stated that the Panorama account had been hacked and announced plans to "file criminal charges against unknown persons". Berlin Mayor Kai Wegner said, "Anti-Semitism has no place in Berlin, and that also applies to the art scene", without specifying what parts of the festival he was referring to. On Twitter, Wegner posted, "Berlin is firmly on Israel's side." In their speeches, Adra and Abraham called for a political solution to end the occupation, accused Israel of massacre, and criticised Germany for selling arms to Israel. The organizers said the "filmmakers' statements were independent and should be accepted as long as they respect the legal framework".

Abraham told The Guardian, "To stand on German soil as the son of Holocaust survivors and call for a ceasefire—and to then be labelled as antisemitic is not only outrageous, it is also literally putting Jewish lives in danger", and reported that his family in Israel had evacuated their home after "a right-wing Israeli mob" came in search of him. He was also concerned for the safety of Adra, who had since returned to the West Bank.

==== Pro-Israeli criticism ====
Israeli culture minister Miki Zohar denounced the film's 2025 Oscar win as a "sad moment for the world of cinema", adding: "Freedom of expression is an important value, but turning the defamation of Israel into a tool for international promotion is not art—it is sabotage against the State of Israel, especially in the wake of the October 7th massacre and the ongoing war". Roni Aboulafia of the Israeli Documentary Filmmakers Forum called Zohar's remarks "shameful", saying they reflected growing restrictions on free speech in Israel. Jonathan Sacerdoti decried the film's use of an Israeli song, "Ein Li Eretz Acheret" ("I Have No Other Land"), in what he deemed cultural appropriation and erasure of Jewish historical land claims in the region. Israeli NGO Regavim said the film used a "concoction of misrepresentations and outright fabrications".

German culture minister Claudia Roth called Abraham's and Adra's acceptance speeches at the Berlin International Film Festival "shockingly one-sided". Senator for cultural affairs Joe Chialo called them "self-righteous anti-Israeli propaganda that has no place on the stages of Berlin". Mayor Kai Wegner called the ceremony antisemitic. Festival director Tricia Tuttle disagreed, and affirmed her support for the filmmakers.

Hollywood nonprofit Creative Community for Peace said the film "presents a one-sided, inaccurate narrative that demonizes Israelis and overlooks the rationale behind Israel's security policies in the West Bank". Melanie Phillips said Masafer Yatta was "never under Palestinian Arab control" and that Adra had committed arson in Masafer Yatta in 2021 while blaming Jews for the act; Adra denied starting a fire, posting a video on Twitter showing the fire was caused by a tear-gas canister. In TheWrap, Golan Ramraz called the film "a piece of propaganda draped in the trappings of journalism", noting the lack of settlement in the area in the 1980s and offers by Israeli authorities to compromise by allowing limited settlement there. Miami Beach mayor Steven Meiner called it a "false, one-sided propaganda attack on the Jewish people", and attempted to ban the film from playing in Miami Beach before backing down. After the film won the Academy Award for Best Documentary Feature Film, Israeli news outlets Ynet and Israel National News published op-eds calling it "Pallywood propaganda".

==== Pro-Palestinian criticism ====
The Palestinian Campaign for the Academic and Cultural Boycott of Israel (PACBI) declared that the film violates the BDS movement's anti-normalization guidelines on interaction with Israelis, saying, "Palestinians do not need validation, legitimation or permission from Israelis to narrate our history, our present, our experiences, our dreams, and our resistance." PACBI also argued that Hollywood has long dehumanized Palestinians, Arabs, Muslims, Black people, and Indigenous communities. In an interview with +972 Magazine, the head of the Masafer Yatta village council, Nidal Younis, said he respected PACBI's criticism, but believed that "the pros outweigh the cons, and the film should not be boycotted. It tells our story, the Palestinian story. There is no Israeli story in it. Yuval is a true partner, and so are all the international and Jewish activists who sleep in Masafer Yatta and defend us from settler and army attacks." Other activists criticized PACBI's statement and endorsed the film. Khirbet Susya village council head Jihad Al-Nawaja said she did not know "what the BDS people are talking about", calling Abraham "far more Palestinian than most of these online commentators attacking him" and asserting they would not boycott the film if they actually came to live in the village.

== Violent incidents related to film ==
The settler who shoots Zakaria al-Adra at the end of the film was identified as Yitzhak Nir. Nir said he was acting in self-defense and was not charged by the police. Nir's father and uncle perpetrated the 1983 Hebron University attack that killed three Palestinians and wounded 33 more. The Israeli military bulldozed Zakaria al-Adra's home in May 2024. In February 2025, co-director Basel Adra was attacked by Israeli settlers in the West Bank.

On 24 March 2025, co-director Hamdan Ballal was attacked by Israeli settlers at his home in Susiya in the West Bank and left with head injuries. He was taken away from medical care by soldiers with the Israel Defense Forces, who invaded the ambulance that was transporting him and detained him for a day before releasing him. Over 800 members of the Academy of Motion Picture Arts and Sciences signed an open letter criticizing the Academy for not publicly supporting Ballal after his arrest. The letter reads, "The targeting of Ballal is not just an attack on one filmmaker—it is an attack on all those who dare to bear witness and tell inconvenient truths." On 28 July 2025, Awdah Hathaleen (also known as Odeh Hadalin), a consultant on the film, was fatally shot by Yinon Levi, an Israeli settler who had previously been placed under EU and US sanctions.

== See also ==
- Academy Award for Best Documentary Feature Film
- Submissions for the Academy Award for Best Documentary Feature
