= Anti-normalization =

Political term

Anti-normalization is a political stance and set of practices within the pro-Palestinian movement that opposes engagement with Israelis or Israeli institutions. This concept has become a significant component of Palestinian activism, particularly in connection with the Boycott, Divestment, Sanctions (BDS) movement. The tenet has been criticized by Jewish organizations, including StandWithUs and the Anti-Defamation League, since anti-normalization is embodied in socially shunning Israelis or pro-Israel Jews. For instance, at Harvard University, a task force on combating antisemitism found that Israeli students were excluded from campus social groups and that

"non-Jewish students unconnected to Israel ... had come under social pressure to end friendships with Israeli students. American Jewish students told us similar stories, where they felt pressure to condemn Israel to prove they were 'one of the good ones' (meaning, an 'anti-Zionist Jew'), and faced social consequences when they refused. This is best understood as an attempt to deny the humanity of Israelis, by treating them as pariahs unworthy of respect as fellow humans rather than fellow Harvard affiliates."

The Palestinian Campaign for the Academic and Cultural Boycott of Israel (PACBI), which leads the BDS movement, condemned Oscar-winning documentary No Other Land on anti-normalization grounds. According to PACBI, the movie, which covers Israeli settlements in the West Bank, featured collaboration between Israelis and Palestinians without sufficient condemnation of Israel. PACBI's stance was criticized by Palestinian activists and West Bank residents, including Nidal Younis, head of the village council in Masafer Yatta, the location of the film's events. Professor Ned Lazarus of George Washington University, formerly of Seeds of Peace, said anti-normalization could affect peace initiatives.

== See also ==
- Khartoum Resolution
