= Miki Zohar =

Israeli politician (born 1980)

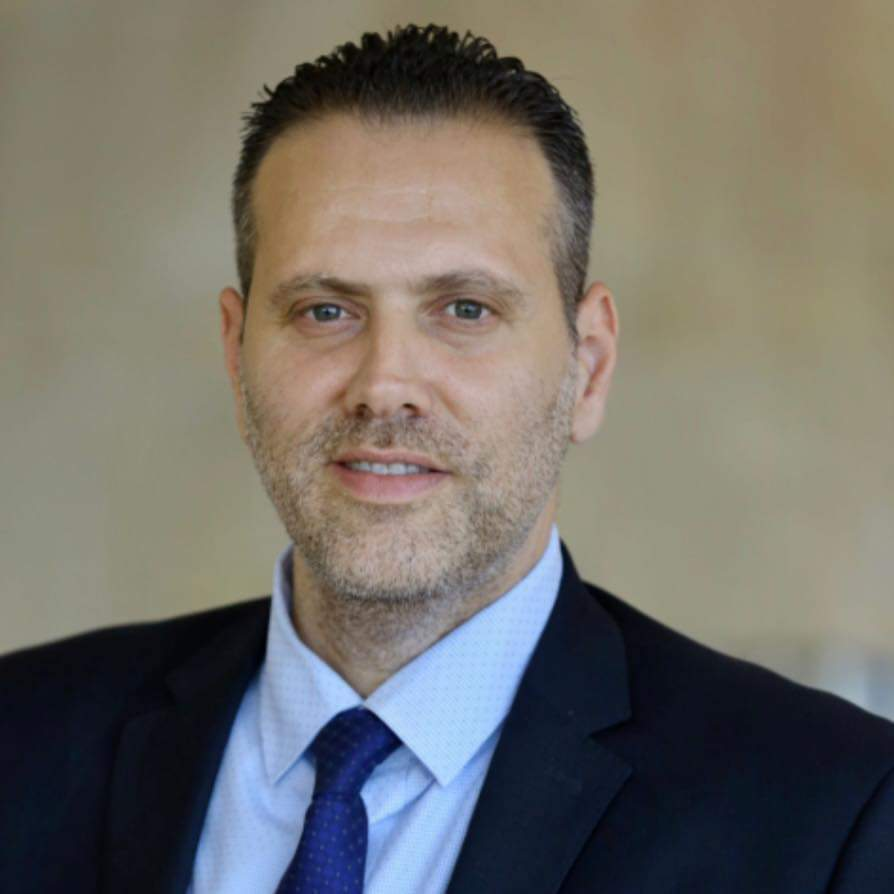
- Zohar in 2020

Ministerial roles
- 2022–: Minister of Culture

Faction represented in the Knesset
- 2015–2023: Likud
- 2026–: Likud

Personal details
- Born: 28 March 1980 (age 46) Beersheba, Israel

Makhlouf "Miki" Zohar (Hebrew: מַכְלוּף "מִיקִי" זוֹהַר; born 28 March 1980) is an Israeli politician. He currently serves as the Minister of Culture and Sports in the thirty-seventh government. Zohar is a member of the Knesset for Likud since 2026 and previously served in the position from 2015 until 2023; he also served as chair of Global Likud.

== Biography ==
Makhlouf Zohar was born in Beersheba, and raised in Kiryat Gat. His father Eli was an immigrant from Morocco and his mother Dina was from Tunisia. Zohar served in the Israel Defense Forces (IDF) and reached the rank of sergeant. He then studied law, gaining an LLB from the College of Law and Business and an MA from Bar-Ilan University, and worked in real estate. Zohar is married to Yamit and has four children.

== Political career ==
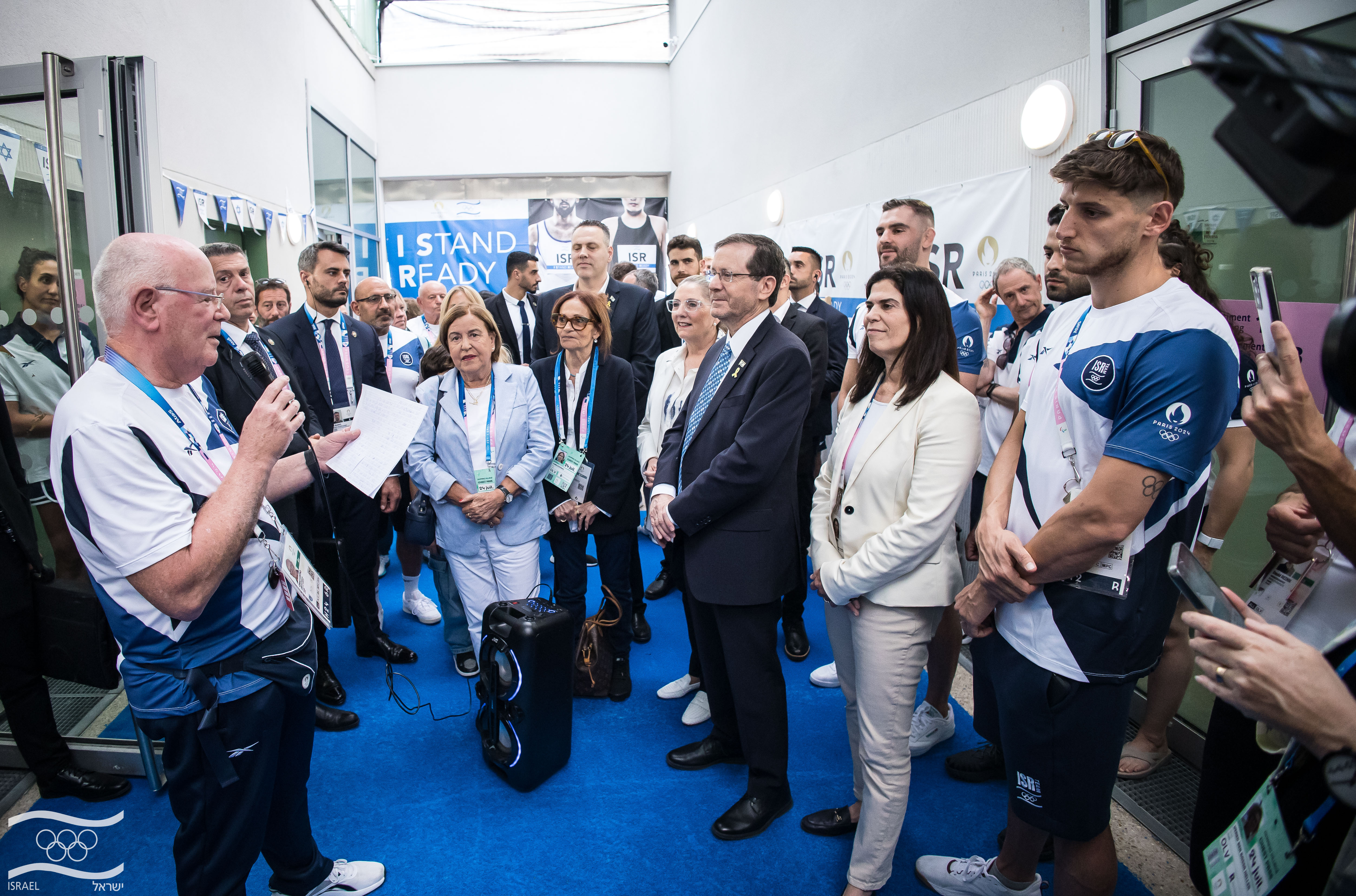
Zohar and Israeli President Isaac Herzog with Israeli athletes in the Olympic village in Paris, 24 July 2024

In 2005 Zohar was elected to Kiryat Gat City Council. In 2013, he was elected head of Kiryat Gat's Likud list in 2013, and became Deputy Mayor. Prior to the 2015 Knesset elections he was placed twenty-second on the Likud list, a slot reserved for a candidate from the Negev area. He was elected to the Knesset as Likud won 30 seats. He was re-elected in April 2019 after being placed twenty-sixth on the party's list. He was re-elected in subsequent elections in September 2019 and March 2020, serving as Deputy Speaker of the Knesset and coalition whip from May 2020 to April 2021. After being re-elected in March 2021, he chaired the Arrangements Committee from April to May 2021.

On 29 December 2022, Zohar became the Minister of Culture and Sport. He resigned from the Knesset on 6 January 2023 as part of the Norwegian Law.

In 2024, Zohar signed a political agreement with left-wing and progressive factions within the national institutions, bypassing the right-wing factions of the governing coalition in the Knesset. The move sparked significant controversy within the Likud movement and among World Likud members in the Diaspora. According to a report in The Jerusalem Post, the agreement included strategic cooperation and personal appointments as part of the elections for the institutions of the World Zionist Organization.

== Views and opinions ==
Zohar is an advocate for observing Shabbat. He filed a bill that would outlaw forcing business owners to work on Saturdays. In addition, business owners would be able to file a claim for damages against members who violate Shabbat that harm them financially. Zohar stated in a radio interview for an ultra-Orthodox Jewish station that "Anyone who doesn't believe in God is delusional".

Zohar supported the creation of a new Israeli national holiday, Yom HaAliyah (Hebrew: יום העלייה, Aliyah Day) to be celebrated annually on the tenth of the Hebrew month of Nisan (Hebrew: י’ ניסן). On 21 June 2016, the Knesset voted in favor of adding Yom HaAliyah to the national calendar. The Yom HaAliyah bill was co-sponsored by Knesset members from different parties in a rare instance of cooperation across the political spectrum. The day chosen for Yom HaAliyah is, according to the biblical narrative, the day Joshua and the Israelites crossed the Jordan River at Gilgal into the Promised Land. It was thus the first documented "mass Aliyah".

In June 2018, he stated in a radio debate that "the entire Jewish race is the highest human capital, the smartest, the most comprehending".

In November 2018, Zohar submitted a bill in favor of replacing live animal shipments with chilled meat imports, after reports exposing widespread animal cruelty and health issues connected with live shipments.

During the COVID-19 pandemic Zohar was heavily criticized for his actions and words against Finance Minister Israel Katz, Yifat Shasha Biton, head of the COVID-19 Knesset committee, and Prof. Ronni Gamzu, the "Corona czar" directly appointed by Prime Minister Netanyahu. He was also accused of nepotism and favoritism when advocating for private weddings and gatherings to be held during the pandemic, while his family members own wedding halls.

In May 2025, Zohar stated that the goal of the Israeli offensive in Gaza following the 7 October massacres was "the complete occupation of the Strip".

In September 2025, the Israeli drama film The Sea, about a Palestinian boy from Ramallah, won five Ophir Awards awarded by the Israeli Academy of Film and Television. The positive reception of the film and negative portrayal of IDF soldiers prompted Zohar to announce the withdrawal of government funding to the awards ceremony.

In September 2026, the Israeli documentary NAZA won the Special Jury Prize at the Venice Film Festival. The film looks at how Israel has used AI-powered systems in Gaza — what the festival's official synopsis calls "calculated mass killings" of Palestinians. The film's recognition, along with its critical depiction of Israel's military actions, prompted Culture Minister Miki Zohar to threaten to revoke the Israeli citizenship of filmmakers Yuval Abraham and Rachel Szor. Zohar called the documentary "vile" and described its win at the festival as "shocking," accusing the filmmakers of harming the country "just to get applause from antisemites around the world" and saying their actions "constitute treason against the state." He wrote: "As culture minister, I will act immediately to revoke the Israeli citizenship of these despicable creators for treason against the state."
