= NAZA (film) =

2026 documentary film by Yuval Abraham and Rachel Szor

- Theatrical release poster
- Directed by: Yuval Abraham; Rachel Szor
- Written by: Yuval Abraham; Rachel Szor
- Produced by: Harry Davies; Lindsay Poulton; James Wilson
- Starring: Yuval Abraham
- Cinematography: Rachel Szor
- Edited by: Yuval Abraham; Rachel Szor
- Production companies: The Guardian; JW Films
- Distributed by: Dogwoof
- Release dates: 10 September 2026 (Venice); 16 October 2026 (United Kingdom)
- Running time: 77 minutes
- Country: United Kingdom
- Languages: Hebrew; English; Arabic
- Box office: $15 million

NAZA is a 2026 British documentary film written and directed by Yuval Abraham and Rachel Szor. Produced by The Guardian and JW Films, it investigates the integration of artificial intelligence and automated surveillance in military targeting systems used by the Israel Defense Forces (IDF) during the ongoing Gaza war and genocide. Its title is derived from Nezek Agavi (Hebrew: נזק אגבי), the Hebrew military term for collateral damage.

The film premiered in the main competition of the 83rd Venice International Film Festival on 10 September 2026, where it won the Special Jury Prize, going on to secure theatrical distribution in over 50 territories. It was theatrically released in the United Kingdom by Dogwoof on 16 October. A global streaming release on The Guardian's website is due to follow in early December.

Despite not having had a theatrical release in Israel, the film caused political controversy there due to its accounts of the country's actions in Gaza, and prompted threats against Abraham and Szor, including threats by the Israeli government to revoke their citizenship, while the IDF denied the claims presented in the film. Internationally, the film has been widely acclaimed by critics following its theatrical release.

== Synopsis ==
The film shows nighttime interviews with 24 Israeli soldiers and intelligence officers, conducted by Yuval Abraham over three years on rooftops in Tel Aviv. Shown only as dark silhouettes with their voices distorted to hide their identities, the interviewees describe the AI systems and mobile phone surveillance used to identify targets in Gaza and their role in the mass killing of Palestinian civilians. Some draw simple maps and diagrams to illustrate their points. Interspersed with the interviews are shots of Tel Aviv at night. One interview is interrupted by an air raid siren, and a rocket from Gaza is seen streaking overhead. An introductory sequence summarises the October 7 attacks.

A soldier explains that "NAZA" is a military acronym for Nezek Agavi (Hebrew: נזק אגבי), meaning "collateral damage". Each potential target, such as an individual Hamas member, is assigned a NAZA value representing the expected number of civilian deaths from an airstrike. "We say 15 NAZA. We don't say 15 people killed and certainly not that 15 children and women will be killed." According to one interviewee, targets with values below 20 required no special authorization, while approvals could be granted for higher values, up to 500 in one case. The combined NAZA values of all potential Hamas fighters add up to "all of Gaza", one source says. An interviewee adds, "At the start of the war, we bombed everything. NAZA wasn't an issue." During efforts to drive Palestinians from northern Gaza, maps used color-coded quadrants to track progress. An interviewee says the objective was to destroy as much as possible before questions about the legitimacy of military operations could arise.

"Annihilation zones" were designated from Tel Aviv, and Palestinians learned their boundaries by being shot when they entered them. "Whoever you decided to kill was considered a terrorist," a man explains. One interviewee recalls Israeli snipers firing on starving people at a food distribution point and illustrates the incident with a stick-figure drawing. Bodies were left lying in the streets until they were eaten by dogs. A female soldier recounts how when injured people were left lying on the ground, she would drop another bomb on them to kill them.

Most interviewees describe killing from a distance as routine office work and themselves as merely "cogs" in a machine. They say: "If I hadn’t been there, someone else would have done it." Or: "I trust the system, and I do my job as part of the system." Or: "My role is technical. I’m not supposed to express any moral or principled position." They say the most reliable targets were often not Hamas fighters themselves but their homes, where their families were present. Every building in Gaza is numbered and the storeys of each building are recorded. The relevant buildings were identified by AI surveillance of communications systems in Gaza, by a system known as "Lavender". This analyses vast amounts of data from the Israeli-controlled phone network to extrapolate the likelihood that any given individual is a "Hamas operative" – thus creating potential targets for elimination, each with an associated NAZA number. An interviewee says the system has an accuracy rate of 85%. One interviewee calls this system a "factory of targets". However, the Lavender system also made mistakes; among the 70,000 phones it had earmarked, "It once marked an 80-year-old woman. They bombed her house with her entire family in it."

An interviewee explains that intelligence personnel were able to access the cameras and microphones of any phone in Gaza, including those of children. The phrase "Where's Daddy?" refers to hacking into a child's phone to determine when their father will be home, enabling an airstrike to kill the entire family. The name came about because checking children's calls for words like “Daddy” and “return” had proved a particularly effective strategy. An interviewee describes the practice bluntly: "You hack her [i.e. the child's] phone and then kill her." A soldier says that while Hamas sometimes does use human shields, it is absurd to speak of human shields when airstrikes are used to kill them at home alongside their families. "It’s just not true. We bomb them in houses because that’s how we find them,” he says. “They just come home to sleep. That’s where we catch them.” In one case, a father had gone out, inadvertently leaving his mobile phone at home; as a result, the missile aimed at his flat killed his daughters, aged 3 to 6, while he himself was spared. The officer recalls listening in on the phone as one of the daughters burned alive and her mother called for help. An interviewee says the ability to hear everything happening inside people's homes made him "feel like God".

Several interviewees say the mass killing of civilians was not only accepted but viewed as a duty, reflecting the widespread belief in Israel that there were "no innocents in Gaza" in the aftermath of the October 7 attacks. Retaliation is said to have been uppermost in the Israeli intelligence services' minds: "We said we need to erase Gaza … they deserve it." Another interviewee says that killing Palestinians and carrying out the mission "felt good"; although psychological support was available, no one in his unit needed it. One likens it to a video game, while another speaks of doing a remote airstrike, then going for lunch, or going out with friends. The interviewees present themselves as liberals, not racists: "No one in my unit hated Arabs", one asserts.

A member of an elite unit says that at times, completing missions could be "insanely fun". He recalls a visit to Poland and says: "I still see those Nazis as evil, but what does that mean I am?" He says he now understands how a man can destroy an entire building, with all the people inside it, and then carry on as normal and "go home to his degree in clinical psychology". Asked whether he had participated in a genocide, he answers "yes" without hesitation, adding: "We intended to kill those children." Interspersed with this are images of people in Tel Aviv observing a minute of silence on Holocaust Remembrance Day and a retrospective at the Tel Aviv Cinematheque honouring Claude Lanzmann.

A "Bibi Department" within military intelligence is said to use methods such as blackmail to thwart efforts by Palestinians or Israelis to pass information to international investigators in The Hague.

At various points during the film, archive footage is shown. This includes an Israeli-made film from the 1970s celebrating the installation of Gaza's telephone infrastructure by Israel, with a Hebrew voiceover explaining how useful the system would be for surveillance in the years to come, as well as historical footage of the founding of Tel Aviv and images of the last standing building of the earlier Palestinian villages Tel Aviv engulfed, many of whose inhabitants were displaced to Gaza.

There is more that would be too risky to speak about, Abraham is told. Late in the film, a television clip shows a younger Netanyahu promoting his book Terrorism: How the West Can Win and defining terrorism as politically motivated violence against innocents. A short sequence from Gaza shows a Palestinian father looking for his children, calling into a destroyed building, and children's legs protruding from beneath a concrete slab.

== Production ==
Israeli journalists and filmmakers Yuval Abraham and Rachel Szor previously worked together as the Israeli half of the Israeli–Palestinian team that directed No Other Land (2024), which focused on Israeli settler violence against Palestinian communities in the West Bank, and won the Academy Award for Best Documentary Feature Film.

NAZA is a British production, co-produced by The Guardian and British film producer James Wilson's JW Films. The cinematographers were Rachel Szor and one or more anonymous persons. Sound was handled by Robert Farr, Lars Ginzel, and Benjamin Hörbe.

The film was executive produced by Jonathan Glazer, in association with Placeholder Films and Unseen Hand. Wilson and Glazer had previously collaborated on The Zone of Interest (2023), which focused on the life of German Auschwitz commandant Rudolf Höss, and won the Academy Award for Best International Feature.

Abraham explained at the press conference held to mark the film's premiere in Venice that, while the events in Gaza are not the same as the Holocaust, there is a common pattern – that of dehumanisation. This, he said, is what the film aims to show. Dehumanisation was also the reason the acronym NAZA was chosen as the film's title. Abraham said that to him and Szor, who shot most of the film, the use of the acronym for people killed was "the key that held the layer of using language as a form of dehumanisation. It was the key to see how people who see themselves as part of Israel's centre-left, liberal elite could participate in such mass killing."

== Release ==
Szor and Abraham at the 83rd Venice International Film Festival

The film had its world premiere in the main competition of the 83rd Venice International Film Festival on 10 September 2026, where it competed for the Golden Lion. It was the only documentary selected for the festival's main competition, and was only added on 24 August, following consideration of safety concerns about its screening. The film received a 25-minute ovation, the longest in the history of the Venice Film Festival. It was announced as a late addition to the Perlak ('pearls') sidebar section of the 74th San Sebastián International Film Festival. Its North American premiere took place at the Main Slate of the 2026 New York Film Festival on 26 September.

French distribution company MK2 Films handled world sales rights and secured theatrical distributors in 56 territories, among them France, the United Kingdom, Italy, Spain, Germany, Belgium, the Netherlands, Austria, Switzerland, Sweden, Denmark, Norway, Greece, Portugal, Poland, Lithuania, Romania, Bulgaria, Australia, New Zealand, Japan, Hong Kong, Indonesia, Thailand, Canada, Brazil, Turkey, Central America, and the Middle East. The film was also offered to distributors and cinemas in Israel, and The Guardian said at the end of September that it was exploring possibilities of showing it in the occupied Palestinian territories.

The film was released in the United States on 30 September 2026, with The Guardian and MK2 opting to self-distribute. On 21 October, during the documentary's run in the United States, Neon joined as a co-distributor in an effort to help "expand its footprint and to reach larger audiences and communities." Elastica Films secured distribution rights in Spain, programming a 9 October 2026 theatrical release in the territory. In Australia, there were special event screenings on 10 and 11 October, ahead of its release on 15 October. Dogwoof acquired UK and Irish distribution rights to the film, scheduling a theatrical premiere on 15 October, before a general release the following day.

The Guardian also has announced that, following its theatrical release, the film will be made available free of charge for streaming on its website in early December 2026.

== Reception ==
=== Box office ===
Released in Italy on 28 September 2026 by I Wonder Pictures (marking the film's first theatrical outing), NAZA grossed around €1.1 million in the first two days of its theatrical run, topping the Italian box office and surpassing the opening weekend gross of Avengers Endgame: Encore there, resulting in more screenings being added beyond the originally scheduled three days. By 12 October, it had surpassed $5 million in Italy. By 6 November 2026, the film had 717,517 admissions in Italy, ranking third among theatrically released documentaries in the country's history. Only Fahrenheit 9/11 (2004) and March of the Penguins (2005) rank higher.

In the United States, the film started on 30 September exclusively at the IFC Center in New York City. The film expanded nationally to U.S. cinemas on 9 October, reaching 85 North American locations in 30 cities before Neon joined as co-distributor on 21 October. The Hollywood Reporter and IndieWire reported the film surpassing $500k over the 9–12 October holiday weekend. By 16 November, U.S. takings had surpassed $1.4 million.

The Guardian reported on 11 November 2026 that the film had been viewed by over 1.5 million people in 47 countries to date, with global box office takings in excess of $14.5 million.

=== Critical response ===
On review aggregator Rotten Tomatoes, the film holds a 100% approval rating based on 83 reviews, with an average rating of 9.1/10. The website's critical consensus states: "Filmed in shrouded secrecy but illuminating in its overview of how policy can calculate the worth of a human life, Naza is a disquieting interrogation of what constitutes acceptable civilian casualties". On Metacritic, the film has a weighted average score of 93 out of 100 based on 28 critics, indicating "universal acclaim", and has been designated a Metacritic "Must-See".

The British Film Institute review concluded the film was "a devastating watch, especially having so many of your darkest thoughts and suppositions confirmed, but there's no turning away from what's said. In those long shots of people in apartments watching TV or doing yoga, one wonders if Abraham and Szor are showing us the voters responsible for these policies or pointing at all of us." Justin Chang, reviewing the film for NPR, said that the interviewees' "testimony is riveting", and that "[t]he most radical thing about NAZA isn't that it exposes the machinery of death; it's the film's insistence on the value of Palestinian life." Chang expressed "enormous admiration for Abraham and Szor's courage in holding their government to account". The film was a critic's pick in The New York Times; reviewer Manohla Dargis said it was "tough to watch, and impossible to ignore". Eva Wiseman's review in The Observer said the documentary "shows how it is possible to distance and detach ourselves from mass murder." Reporting that the audience exited the cinema in stunned silence after the film, she wondered whether it would be possible "for the pro-war factions of my Jewish family to watch this and feel any different." Film critic Kyle Smith did, writing in an opinion column for The Wall Street Journal that NAZA was "superficially inflammatory but actually ridiculous" and that despite 74,000 dead, the net change in Gaza's overall population was roughly zero.

David Blair and Henry Bodkin wrote in The Daily Telegraph that the film contained "the calm, searing and deeply informed testimony of 24 Israeli intelligence officers and soldiers" and commented on how far Israeli politics and public opinion had moved to the right since the 1982 Peace Now demonstrations. John Bleasdale, writing for Time Out, said, "NAZA puts together a restrained, intelligent, articulate, precise and utterly damning case against Israel's actions in Gaza and their ongoing actions through the region. As a work of cinema, it is exemplary. As a work of journalism, it is inarguable. As a document, it is an indictment." Mark Demetrius, writing for Australian film magazine FilmInk, commented: "Stats are one thing, and personal recollections are another. 'You hack her phone and then kill her', says one of the interviewees – the 'her' in question being a 12-year-old girl. And even with most of their features obscured, and a 'response' of pure silence, you can't miss the intense feelings of another interviewee when asked 'How could you bomb when you heard a baby crying inside?'" Sam Adams wrote in Slate that the film's "real strength – a strength that is particular to filmed documentary – is in X-raying the psyches of the people onscreen." Eli Friedberg of Slant Magazine noted that the interviewees "express a dehumanization of the enemy so complete that they themselves don't recognize it, as when an informant who insists that 'no one in my unit hated Arabs' seems puzzled by the very suggestion of being haunted by the Arab civilians he's killed ... Abraham and Szor contextualize the brutality in Gaza not only through the collective trauma of 10/7, but a generations-old, systematic erasure of Palestinian subjects from historical narratives and mass media that makes their ongoing erasure from land and conscience all too easy."

Robbie Collin awarded 4 out of 5 stars in The Daily Telegraph and said that what emerges from the interviewees' "calm, cogent testimony is a picture of a new form of technologically led warfare that – for those who prosecute it, at least – operates in a trance-like detachment from any ordinary notions of what war actually is." The Toronto Star's Peter Howell described the film as "heartbreaking but essential viewing, questioning the systems that cause and quantify civilian death in modern warfare." Robert Daniels awarded 3.5 of 4 stars on RogerEbert.com and saw the film as "another confirmation that genocide is happening", while deploring that Palestinian-made documentaries like Who Is Still Alive received not enough attention – people should watch both for a complete picture. Gaza filmmaker Mohammed Sawwaf said in The New York Times he wondered at first why NAZA had been given such a platform, given how much material there was available from Palestinians themselves. But having viewed the film in Gaza on his laptop, he said he no longer felt that way, as the film offered a window into a world that was out of reach for him: "I can reach the rubble, but the filmmakers who made 'NAZA' can reach the person who determines which house can become rubble. I can film an injured child after a bombing. They can question the person who took part in the decision that led to it. The two accounts don't cancel each other out; one completes the other." Ayesha Jehangir, writing in The Conversation, viewed the film as an example of "how, in war reporting, the most revealing testimonies can come not from those who suffer the violence, but from those who carry it out."

Donald Clarke concluded his review in The Irish Times by remarking that in addition to concern about current events in the Middle East, the film also "triggers more general horror at how, in the contemporary world, it is too easy to slaughter from a dispassionate distance. An essential record of engineered nightmare." Ahmed Moor, writing in The Nation, said "Abraham and Szor’s effort is consistent with the goals of the Archive Genocide project", but warned that the technology discussed had implications far beyond Gaza: "The tools of totalitarianism exist, and they are here to stay. What the Israelis have developed and utilized to eliminate life in the overwhelming majority of Gaza, every other government either possesses or will possess in the future. We are charged, as citizens of a constitutional democracy, with legislating protections for our civil liberties." Aaron Regunberg praised the documentary's objective style in The New Republic and said: "What the subjects of NAZA are describing is a new era of warfare, based on mass surveillance and AI decision-making, that should never have been allowed to escape the realm of dystopian sci-fi. Now that this computerized barbarity has seeped out into our real world, we’d be fools to think the contagion won’t spread."

Gal Beckerman in The Atlantic likened this AI-assisted form of warfare to the Milgram experiment and said Abraham and Szor "should be commended for making art that peels back the skin and shows us our darkest instincts: our ability to dissociate, to replace people with numbers, to ignore inconvenient suffering". However, by presenting this as "something uniquely malevolent about Israeli society", Beckerman felt the film had also somehow missed an opportunity – that of showing how universal the human potential for "such corrosive thoughtlessness" is. Robert Rotifer, writing for Austrian national broadcaster ORF, also felt reminded of the Milgram experiment and questioned IDF assertions that all targets selected by AI must first be confirmed by humans: "What are these people supposed to say when the principle behind target selection is an algorithm whose functioning is completely opaque to them? What else can they do but trust the algorithm? They only have 20 seconds to make each decision." Rotifer viewed the film as an important record – nobody would henceforth be able to claim that the world didn't know what was happening in Gaza. Radhika Seth in British Vogue described NAZA as a "brilliant and harrowing film" that felt "destined to become an enduring historical document, one which will and should be seen by generations to come". Australian film critic Luke Buckmaster said the film would be "studied for decades".

Belen Edwards, writing for Mashable, described the film as "a living nightmare – and required viewing", adding: "While the interviewees do occasionally show remorse, witnessing them alienate themselves from the horrors time and again is staggering." She noted that the film resembled executive producer Jonathan Glazer's The Zone of Interest in focusing almost entirely on the interviewees rather than showing the victims and images of destruction in Gaza. Omer Bartov, a professor of holocaust and genocide studies at Brown University, described NAZA as "unforgettable" and said the testimony shown in the film provides unique insight into how ordinary people – many of them, in this case, "upper-middle class graduates of the best schools who joined prestigious intelligence units, perhaps with the expectation of moving on after their army service to the hi-tech industry", get "conscripted into a machinery of death". Robert Abele of the Los Angeles Times wrote, NAZA "isn't just tough-to-hear journalism, it's real filmmaking, the visual juxtapositions getting us to think about who doesn't get to enjoy a quiet evening at home, especially when remote war-waging starts to look like a goal-oriented office shift with a lunch break – or a video game." He concluded by saying, "It's stone-cold frightening." Danny Leigh came to much the same conclusion in his 5-star review for the Financial Times: "Journalism and filmmaking brilliantly entwine." Steven W. Thrasher described the film's effect on a cinema audience in Literary Hub: "When NAZA‘s chilling final frame turned black and the sound of moviegoers crying became audible, I experienced something I have never experienced in a movie theater in my life. Nobody in the sold-out screening got up. Not a single person. The entire audience sat, without speaking, through the credits. The only sounds were muffled sobs. And then, wordlessly, the entire Brooklyn audience rose from their seats and left the cinema in total silence."

New York magazine's Rachel Corbett and German public broadcaster MDR's René Martens noted that the film's central claims – that there was routine acceptance of 20 civilians killed when targeting low-ranking Hamas members, with exponentially higher, three-digit figures accepted for medium- and high-ranking Hamas figures – had previously been reported by The Washington Post, The New York Times, +972 and scholars as far back as 2024. Richard Brody said in The New Yorker that the film had turned Abraham's previous reporting in 2023 and 2024 "into front-page news, a center of conflict in its own right. That's the very definition of art – if it's any good at all, it sparks a significant emotional response – and the difference between art and journalism is of exceptional importance in discussions of 'NAZA,' given the political and moral stakes of its revelations. The outcry it has provoked is a reflection of the filmmakers' accomplishments and risks in making the film." The Sydney Morning Herald's Jake Wilson awarded NAZA 4.5 stars and described it as a "compact and precisely shaped film", adding: "What I hadn't counted on was its power as a movie – which it undoubtedly is, as opposed to a piece of conventional journalism."

== Responses ==
=== Israeli government and societal response ===
The film was condemned by Israeli government officials, with the IDF denying the allegations made in the film. Culture minister Miki Zohar called for the directors' citizenship to be revoked, accusing them of committing treason, and threatened to cut the funding of any Israeli cinema showing the documentary. He asked the Interior Ministry and the Population and Immigration Authority to examine whether revoking their citizenship could be justified. Prime minister Benjamin Netanyahu described the film's positive reception at the Venice Film Festival as "shocking" and said the film was part of "global antisemitic incitement". He stated that he would introduce bills to revoke the filmmakers' Israeli citizenship and raise defamation charges. IDF chief of staff Eyal Zamir raised the possibility of legal action against the filmmakers, criticising the film as libellous and of making "grave, false accusations against IDF soldiers and commanders". He also ordered an investigation into the alleged unauthorised disclosure of classified material used in the film. On 23 September 2026, Netanyahu backed Miki Zohar's proposal and announced he is in the process of advancing two legislations, one for allowing revocation of citizenship of Israelis who defame soldiers or the state abroad, and another for raising the defamation of Israel or the IDF with penalties up to a million shekels.

Itamar Ben-Gvir, minister of national security, called the directors "a disgrace". A week after the film's premiere in Venice, right-wing protestors linked to Ben Gvir's Otzma Yehudit party surrounded Rachel Szor's parents' house. The protestors made explicit calls for violence, including calls to "execute the traitors". Many other journalists, politicians, influencers and organizers also threatened the filmmakers. In addition, protests occurred at addresses belonging to them and their colleagues after far-right journalist Yehuda Schlesinger of Channel 14 said the filmmakers should be "pursued" or "hunted" wherever they go, encouraging people to prevent them from returning to Israel. As of October 2026, Abraham and Szor had not returned to Israel, saying that death threats made it unsafe, and were staying in London.

In October 2026, Israeli directors Hagai Gutman and Ariel Averbuch, and IDF reserve officer Lt. Col. Roi Danino, released a counter documentary titled NAZA: The Real Story, in an effort to discredit the claims made in NAZA. The film mimics NAZA's visual style, featuring rooftop interviews shot at night, and is being promoted by the Israeli government. The Guardian reported that before the video was added to it, the site "falsely presented itself as a promotional page for NAZA ... distorting the film's official synopsis by removing the reference to the deaths of Palestinian civilians".

On 11 October, Netanyahu ordered the IDF chief of staff, the head of Israel's Shin Bet internal security service and Israel's attorney general to identify the people interviewed in NAZA so as to prosecute them for "serious information security offenses, criminal defamation and harm to Israel's diplomatic and security interests."

In the week following the film's premiere, over a thousand Israeli filmmakers signed a petition in support of Abraham and Szor, as a response to an "unprecedented campaign of incitement and instigation" against the filmmakers. The petition stated that "the central role of art and journalism is to hold a mirror up to the society in which they exist". The signatories included several of Israel's most prominent directors, among them Ari Folman, Shlomi Elkabetz, Ran Tal, and Michal Aviad.

In the same week, over 40 Israeli human rights, equality, and peace organizations also published a joint statement in support of the film's directors. The statement called "on the authorities to put an end to the wave of incitement and threats of violence" against Abraham and Szor. Signatories included Combatants for Peace, B'Tselem, Peace Now, Breaking the Silence, and Adalah.

The International Documentary Association published a letter on its website urging the Israeli government "to withdraw its threats against filmmakers Yuval Abraham and Rachel Szor" as well as calling for an "end to the public campaign of intimidation against them". PEN America asked for Israeli officials' threats against Abraham and Szor to stop and for Gaza to be opened to the international press, so Palestinian writers and filmmakers would not "have to bear witness alone", noting that Palestinian films such as Citizen Osama were receiving less attention.

In Venice, producer James Wilson addressed accusations of antisemitism levelled against various people in the film industry by saying, "I'm Jewish. Yuval and Rachel are Jewish Israelis. Jon Glazer is Jewish. I'm not saying that means we're right or wrong. I’m personally not worried about being accused of being anti-Semitic because I am not, and I don't think my colleagues are. [...] I don't myself think there is any connection between Judaism or Jewishness, and the policies of successive Israeli governments towards the Indigenous population of Palestine."

=== IDF response ===
On 1 October 2026, the IDF published a response after it was given a copy of the film and watched it. According to the IDF, the late response was due to the time needed to examine the film's accusations, as well as the fact that the filmmakers had not sent the claims in advance, and had not let the IDF see the film until shortly before the statement. In the response, the IDF said the film was a "misrepresented and manipulative depiction of reality", rejecting how the film described the strike planning and denying the civilian casualty numbers it claimed, including ratios like 500 civilians to one militant, 200 to one, or 20 to one. It also stated that it never planned or approved any strike where around 500 civilians were expected to die. The Israeli military added that targets are approved only by humans, not by AI. According to the IDF, even under the assumption that the soldiers that were interviewed in the film did serve in the roles attributed to them, it was still clear from their words in the film that they were not a part of any broad decision-making process. The Guardian, one of the film producers, released a statement in response, saying:

The IDF's attempt to portray the 24 participants in NAZA as junior-ranking officers involved only in the early stages of the targeting process is false. They include officers and soldiers who were involved in multiple stages of the targeting process in Gaza, including intelligence, operations and the final authorisation process. The process of assessing the credibility of the testimonies was rigorous. It included leaked classified documents, detailed verification of specific strikes and corroboration via a wider pool of confidential journalistic sources who did not appear on camera in the film. Over the past three years we have together interviewed more than 100 sources familiar with IDF systems used in the war in Gaza, including senior-ranking commanders directly involved in the authorisation of strikes.

=== Independent analysis by the press ===
German magazine Der Spiegel stated on the occasion of the film's release in Germany on 30 September 2026 that the key accounts presented in the film had been confirmed by Israeli soldiers who had first spoken to Israeli NGO Breaking the Silence and then to Der Spiegel. These sources had also said that they wished to remain anonymous in view of the death threats against the film crew. Specifically regarding the question of whether there might have been a single instance in which 500 civilian casualties were factored in, Der Spiegel referred to an airstrike that took place on 31 October 2023 in the Jabalia refugee camp. According to one of the soldiers, this attack had a NAZA value of 300. According to Airwars, the strike killed at least 126 people – half of them minors – in addition to a local Hamas commander, and injured a further 280 people. The soldier said he was not aware of any case of 500 anticipated deaths, but could not rule such a possibility out. When asked for comment by Der Spiegel, the Israeli army rejected this account, saying there had never been NAZA figures even in the same order of magnitude as 300 and that the expected number of fatalities in Jabalia had been well below 100.

French daily Le Monde said three sources referred to them by Breaking the Silence all cited a NAZA figure of 300 for the attack carried out on 31 October 2023 against Ibrahim Biari, the local Hamas commander in Jabalia. The first source said, "Regarding high-ranking Hamas officers, they were allowed several hundred victims of collateral damage for a single attack." In Jabalia, he said, the estimate was 300 casualties. "Usually there's much more success in minimizing these numbers. All the capabilities of the intelligence are focused on doing that. It was a very big dilemma. But they eventually opted for the attack." The second source quoted the same figure of 300 expected deaths and said there had been a great effort to pinpoint the commander's exact position. When this remained unsuccessful, a decision was made to "drop a few buildings in order to kill him." The third source also cited a figure of 300, saying that the attack was motivated by rising Israeli casualties: "It was the kind of target where it was like exception, exception, exception, and in the end, it was approved." A fourth source, a drone pilot, told Le Monde there are three different fire policies. "Restricted" means a legitimate target is anyone bearing arms and intent on using them. "Limited" also includes anyone helping an armed person, for example, by being a rooftop lookout. "Extended" means that any Hamas or Islamic Jihad member is a legitimate target, regardless of what they are doing: "It means he can be sleeping in his home or walking on the street." For about the first fifteen months of the war, he said, the policy in use was "extended". Along with this, five maximum levels of permissible civilian deaths were defined – none, five, ten, twenty, and forty. The source said, "Most of the war, we were [at up to] 20", stressing that the situation in Jabalia was unusual. Le Monde said these accounts had been submitted to the Israeli military censors to ensure they did not endanger national security, and added that the IDF did not deny their accuracy when asked for comment by Le Monde.

== Accolades ==
Award	Date of ceremony	Category	Recipient(s)	Result	Ref.
Venice Film Festival	12 September 2026	Golden Lion	Yuval Abraham and Rachel Szor	Nominated	
Venice Film Festival	12 September 2026	Special Jury Prize	Yuval Abraham and Rachel Szor	Won	
Venice Film Festival	12 September 2026	Edipo Re Award	Yuval Abraham and Rachel Szor	Won	
Venice Film Festival	12 September 2026	Green Drop Award	Yuval Abraham and Rachel Szor	Won	
Venice Film Festival	12 September 2026	Leoncino d'Oro Award – Mention Cinema for UNICEF	Yuval Abraham and Rachel Szor	Won	
Venice Film Festival	12 September 2026	Sorriso Diverso Venezia Award – Best Director Under 35	Yuval Abraham and Rachel Szor	Won	
San Sebastián International Film Festival	26 September 2026	City of Donostia / San Sebastian Audience Award for Best European Film	Yuval Abraham and Rachel Szor	Won	
Athens International Film Festival	10 October 2026	Best International Documentary	NAZA	Nominated	
Athens International Film Festival	10 October 2026	Best International Documentary – Honorable Mention	NAZA	Won	
Hamptons International Film Festival	13 October 2026	Victor Rabinowitz & Joanne Grant Award for Social Justice	Yuval Abraham and Rachel Szor	Won	
Hamptons International Film Festival	13 October 2026	Brizzolara Family Foundation Award for Films of Conflict & Resolution	Yuval Abraham and Rachel Szor	Nominated	
La Roche-sur-Yon International Film Festival	17 October 2026	Audience Award	Yuval Abraham and Rachel Szor	Won	
Hot Springs Documentary Film Festival	17 October 2026	Critics' Choice Grand Jury Prize	NAZA	Won	
Critics' Choice Documentary Awards	8 November 2026	Best Documentary Feature	NAZA	Nominated	
Critics' Choice Documentary Awards	8 November 2026	Best Director	Yuval Abraham and Rachel Szor	Nominated	
Critics' Choice Documentary Awards	8 November 2026	Best Political Documentary	NAZA	Won	
Gotham Independent Film Awards	30 November 2026	Best Documentary Feature	Yuval Abraham, Rachel Szor, Harry Davies, Lindsay Poulton, James Wilson	Pending	
Cinema Eye Honors	11 January 2027	Outstanding Achievement in Nonfiction Feature Filmmaking	Yuval Abraham, Rachel Szor, Harry Davies, Robert Farr	Pending	
Cinema Eye Honors	11 January 2027	Audience Choice Prize	NAZA	Pending	
Cinema Eye Honors	11 January 2027	Outstanding Achievement in Direction	Yuval Abraham and Rachel Szor	Pending	
Cinema Eye Honors	11 January 2027	Outstanding Achievement in Production	Nominees to be determined	Pending	
Cinema Eye Honors	11 January 2027	Outstanding Achievement in Sound Design	Robert Farr	Pending	
European Film Awards	16 January 2027	Best European Film	NAZA	Pending	
European Film Awards	16 January 2027	Best European Documentary	NAZA	Pending	
European Film Awards	16 January 2027	Best European Sound	Robert Farr, Lars Ginzel, Benjamin Hörbe	Pending	

== See also ==
- Non-combatant casualty value
