= NaszaKolej =

Polish rail-focused government programme and campaign

NaszaKolej (lit. 'OurRailway') is a Polish government programme and campaign aimed at promoting long-term development and investment of rail transport in Poland. Its aim is to build new high-speed lines, restore disused railways, and modernise existing infrastructure to build an integrated railway network for Poland by 2050, making it the "most modern railway in Europe".

The campaign was announced by Polish prime minister Donald Tusk on 7 August 2025, however, promotion of NaszaKolej only began in July 2026 (under #NaszaKolej, and various other slogans). NaszaKolej is organised around five main themes: travel, comfort, accessibility, development, and speed.
