= Rachel Szor =

Israeli journalist, film director, editor, cinematographer, and activist

- רחל שור
- Szor in 2026
- Born: 1994 (age 31–32)
- Occupations: Journalist, film director, editor, cinematographer
- Years active: 2017–present

Rachel Szor (Hebrew: רחל שור; born 1994) is an Israeli investigative journalist, film director, editor, cinematographer, and activist. She rose to international prominence when she co-directed No Other Land (2024), an Oscar-winning documentary about the Israel Defense Forces and settler violence in the West Bank.

Her second documentary feature, NAZA (2026), examines the role of the Israeli government in the mass killing of Palestinians in Gaza, and won the Special Jury Prize at the 83rd Venice International Film Festival.

== Biography ==
Born in Tel Aviv, Szor attended the Thelma Yellin High School for the Arts. In 2017, she participated in a four-month program at the Arava Institute for Environmental Studies.

== Career ==
=== No Other Land ===
Szor co-directed, co-filmed and featured in the documentary No Other Land (2024) with Basel Adra, Yuval Abraham, and Hamdan Ballal, about Adra's long-term attempts to resist Israeli settler violence and displacement from his home in Masafer Yatta. The group had no experience in documentary filmmaking and initially approached the story as activists and journalists. Working together for over five years, with Adra and Ballal having footage including home videos from Adra's family, the documentary depicts Adra befriending Abraham and juxtaposes Adra's life under occupation with Abraham's life of freedom.

No Other Land premiered in February 2024 to critical acclaim at the 74th Berlin International Film Festival (Berlinale), where it won two awards: The Panorama Audience Award for Best Documentary Film and the Berlinale Documentary Film Award. It went on to win the European Documentary award at the 37th European Film Awards and the Academy Award for Best Documentary Feature Film at the 97th Academy Awards in 2025.

=== NAZA ===
Szor co-wrote, co-directed and co-filmed the documentary NAZA (2026), again with Yuval Abraham. It was shot in Tel Aviv during the ongoing Gaza war, and reveals the Israeli government's role in the mass killing of Palestinian civilians during the conflict. The film is built around interviews with 24 Israeli soldiers and intelligence officers, most of which Szor filmed. Produced by The Guardian and British producer James Wilson's JW Films, the film was selected for the main competition of the 83rd Venice International Film Festival, where it won the Special Jury Prize.

On 14 September 2026, shortly after the Venice awards ceremony, The Guardian reported that Israeli culture minister, Miki Zohar, had declared on X that he would "act immediately to revoke the Israeli citizenship of these despicable creators [Abraham and Szor] for treason against the state". Zohar asked the Interior Ministry and the Population and Immigration Authority to examine whether their conduct could justify revoking their citizenship. The same day, IDF Chief of Staff Eyal Zamir ordered a review of possible legal action against the film and those involved in it. Prime minister Benjamin Netanyahu subsequently announced that his government would seek to pass legislation to revoke the citizenship of Israelis who "defame" Israeli soldiers abroad, citing Abraham and Szor in the statement.

On 16 September 2026, dozens of far-right activists demonstrated outside the home of Szor's parents in Savyon, chanting "Death sentence to traitors". Szor and Abraham have not returned to Israel since the Venice premiere. In October 2026 they said that death threats prevented them from going back and that they were staying in London, though they were "not really in hiding".

== Filmography ==
Year	English title	Original title	Notes
2024	No Other Land	لا أرض أخرى	Co-directed with Yuval Abraham, Basel Adra, and Hamdan Ballal
2026	NAZA	נז״א	Co-directed with Yuval Abraham
