= Yuval Abraham =

Israeli journalist, film director, translator and activist (born 1995)

- יובל אברהם
- Abraham in 2026
- Born: 1995 (age 30–31); Beersheba, Israel
- Occupations: Journalist, film director
- Years active: 2017–present

Yuval Abraham (Hebrew: יובל אברהם; born 1995) is an Israeli investigative journalist, film director, and Arabic–Hebrew translator. He rose to international prominence when he co-directed No Other Land (2024), an Oscar-winning documentary about the Israel Defense Forces and settler violence in the West Bank, and gave a pro-equality speech at the 74th Berlin International Film Festival. His 2026 documentary NAZA with Rachel Szor about the Israeli Government's role in the mass killing of Palestinian civilians during the ongoing Gaza war won a special jury award at the Venice Film festival in September. Shortly thereafter the Israeli government threatened to revoke their citizenship.

In 2024, he was awarded the Emil Grunzweig Human Rights Award for his "outstanding contribution" to the advancement of human rights in Israel.

== Early life and education ==
Yuval Abraham was born to an Israeli middle-class family in the southern city of Beersheba. He is of Mizrahi Jewish and Ashkenazi Jewish ancestry; his Jewish Yemenite grandfather was a fluent Palestinian Arabic speaker. One of his grandmothers was born in an Italian concentration camp in Libya, and one of his grandfathers lost most of his family in the Holocaust.

At 19, Abraham was enlisted and assigned to the Israel Defense Forces (IDF)'s Intelligence Corps, but he never assumed his role; after a week in training, he refused to serve for political and personal reasons and decided to leave the army. The process of leaving took a few weeks, during which he was assigned to be a quartermaster in the Israeli Air Force. After leaving the military, he did volunteer work with Israeli and Palestinian children at schools for two years.

== Career ==
=== Writing and translation ===
Learning Arabic and meeting Palestinians in the West Bank, including staying with families as their homes were demolished by the IDF, was how Abraham became an outspoken critic of the Israeli military's occupation of Palestinians. He has worked in language education and taught Arabic.

In 2019, Abraham contacted London-based journalist Ahmed Alnaouq, who runs the Gaza writers' collective We Are Not Numbers (WANN), for an interview. He subsequently helped Alnaouq, who wanted the stories to reach a wider audience, connect with translators. Together, Abraham and Alnaouq founded Across the Wall, a platform where Palestinians' stories are translated into Hebrew with the aim of humanising Palestinians and challenging mainstream Israeli narratives that demonise them. The webpage reportedly received over a million visitors in 2021. The project was put on indefinite hiatus in November 2023 after 23 members of Alnaouq's family, including young children, were killed by Israeli bombing.

As of 2024, Abraham was working as a journalist and investigative reporter for the independent media outlets +972 Magazine and Local Call, having called them "the only places" where he can "try to use my privilege to expose the mechanisms of oppression in our country, whether it's by documenting the demolition of a Palestinian family's home in Jerusalem or speaking to refugees in Jenin". He also worked for Social TV, contributed to publications such as The Guardian and The Nation, and appeared on networks such as Democracy Now! and CNN.

In 2024, he was awarded the Emil Grunzweig Human Rights Award for his outstanding contribution to the advancement of human rights in Israel.

=== No Other Land ===
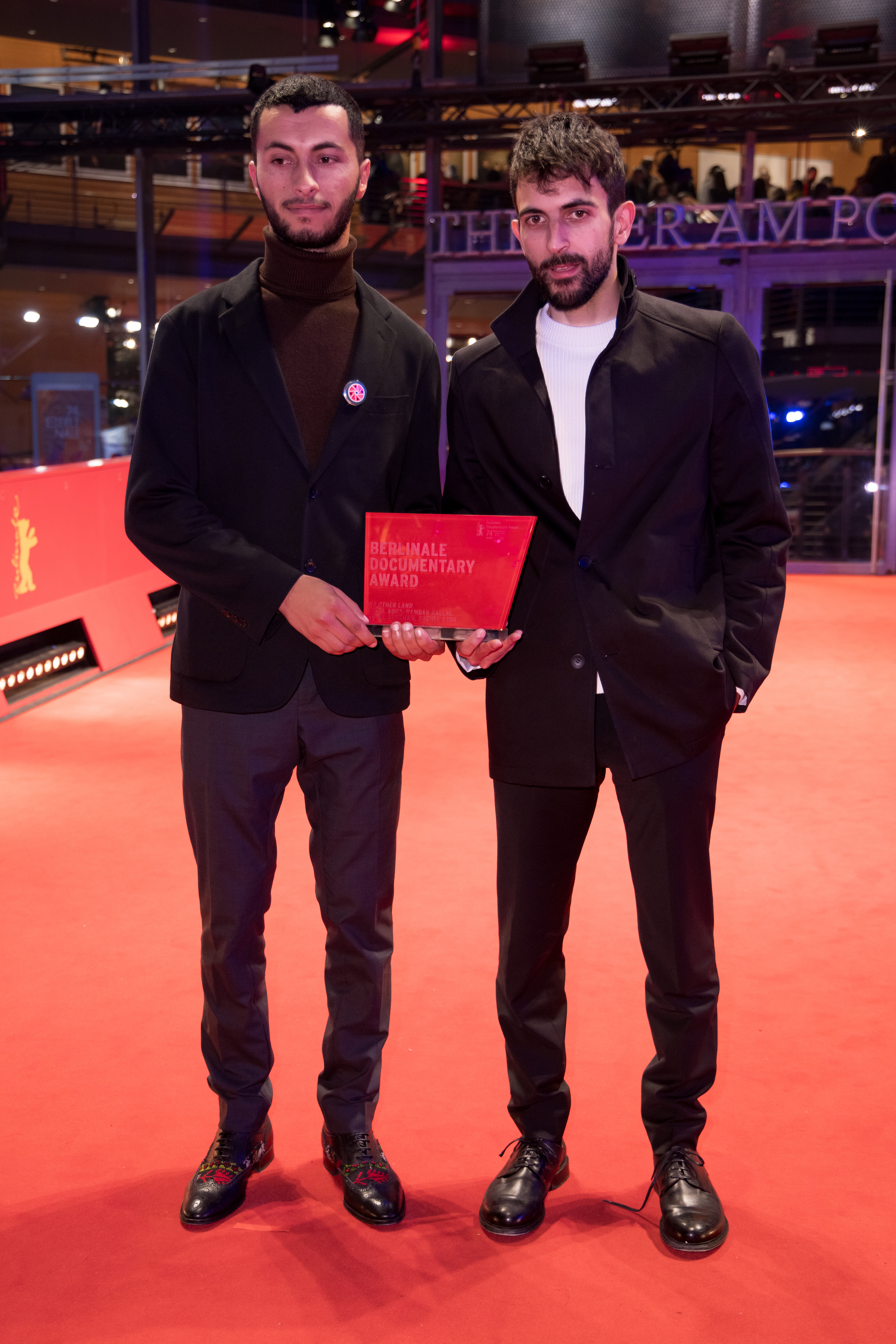
Abraham (right) and Basel Adra with their Berlinale award

Abraham co-wrote, co-directed, co-filmed, and featured in the documentary No Other Land with Basel Adra, Hamdan Ballal, and Rachel Szor, about Adra's long-term attempts to resist Israeli settler violence and displacement from his home in Masafer Yatta. The group had no experience in documentary filmmaking and initially approached the story as activists and journalists. Working together for over five years, with Adra and Ballal having footage including home videos from Adra's family, the documentary depicts Adra befriending Abraham and juxtaposes Adra's life under occupation with Abraham's life of freedom. No Other Land opened in February 2024 to critical acclaim at the 74th Berlin International Film Festival (Berlinale), where it won two awards: The Panorama Audience Award for Best Documentary Film and the Berlinale Documentary Film Award.

In his acceptance speech, Abraham called for a ceasefire in Gaza and for the "situation of apartheid [and] inequality" between himself and Adra in the occupied West Bank to end. This drew accusations of antisemitism toward the event from Israeli media and German politicians, such as Kai Wegner. After receiving death threats and a right-wing mob searching for him at his family's house in Israel, Abraham was forced to cancel his flight back home. Abraham made a viral statement on social media: "The appalling misuse of this word […] not only to silence Palestinian critics of Israel, but also to silence Israelis like me who support a ceasefire […] empties the word antisemitism of meaning and thus endangers Jews all over the world". He found it "particularly outraging" coming from German politicians, and also expressed concern for Adra's safety "under a military occupation surrounded by violent settlements". The Committee to Protect Journalists (CPJ) urged authorities to protect Abraham and his family. In an interview on Israeli television, Abraham said he found it most difficult that his mother paid a price for his speech when a mob came to his house to search for him, causing her to leave, adding that he accepted the criticism of those who scolded him for not mentioning the Israeli hostages held in Gaza in his speech, saying "in retrospect, I would have mentioned the hostages", noting the speech was short and unplanned as they did not expect to win, and that calling for a ceasefire benefited the hostages too.

=== NAZA ===
Abraham co-wrote, co-directed, and featured in the 2026 feature documentary film NAZA, again with Rachel Szor. It was shot in Tel Aviv during the ongoing Gaza war, and reveals the Israeli Government's role in the mass killing of Palestinian civilians during the conflict. Produced by The Guardian and British producer James Wilson's JW Films, the film was selected for the main competition of the 83rd Venice International Film Festival and was awarded the Special Jury Prize.

On 14 September 2026, shortly after the Venice awards ceremony, The Guardian reported that Israeli culture minister, Miki Zohar, had used the social media platform X to declare that he would "act immediately to revoke the Israeli citizenship of these despicable creators [Abraham and Szor] for treason against the state". Benjamin Netanyahu, the Prime Minister of Israel, subsequently announced that his government would seek to pass legislation to revoke the citizenship of Israelis who "defame" Israeli soldiers abroad, citing Abraham and Szor in the statement.

== Filmography ==
Year	English title	Original title	Notes
2024	No Other Land	لا أرض أخرى	Co-directed with Basel Adra, Hamdan Ballal, and Rachel Szor
2026	NAZA	נז״א	Co-directed with Rachel Szor
