= Sami Turgeman =

Israeli general (born 1964)

- סמי תורג'מן
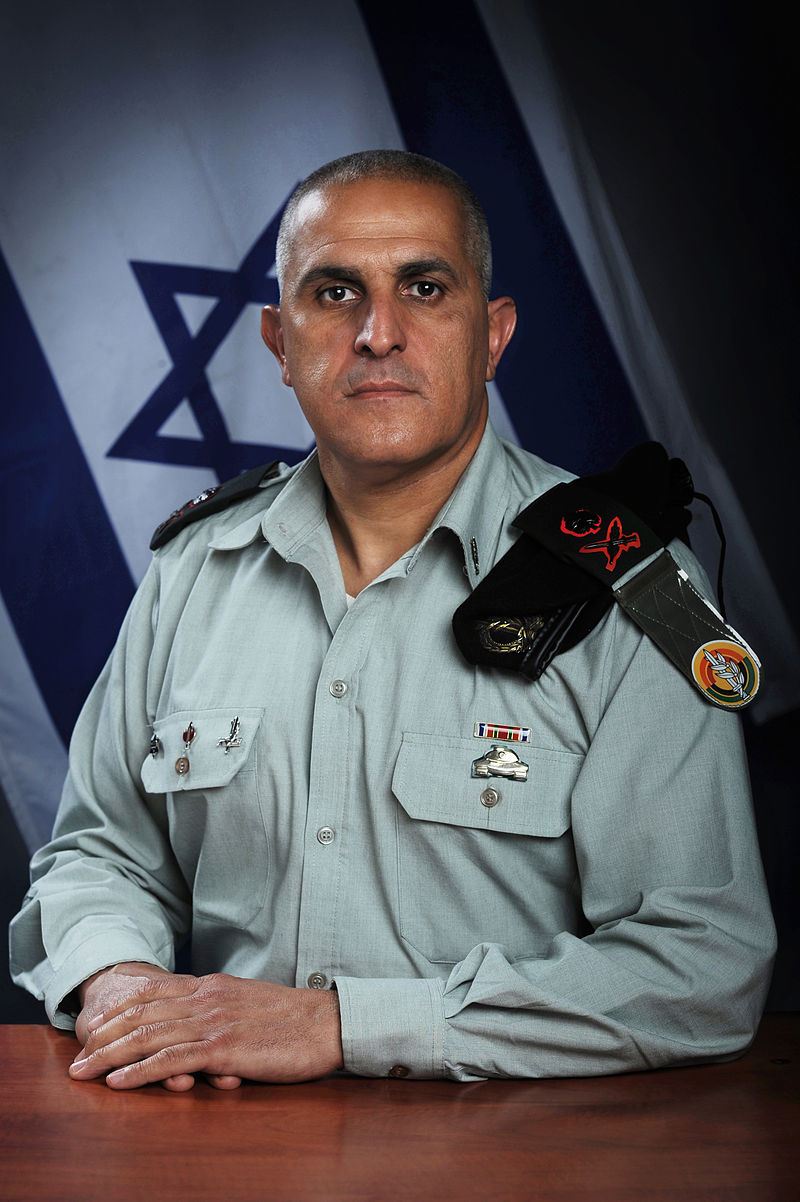
- Born: July 11, 1964 (age 62); Marrakesh, Morocco
- Military career
- Allegiance: Israel
- Service years: 1982–2015
- Rank: Aluf
- Commands: Armored Corps, Operations Brigade, GOC Army Headquarters
- Conflicts: 1982 Lebanon War; First Intifada; Second Intifada; Second Lebanon War; Operation Cast Lead; Operation Protective Edge

Shlomo "Sami" Turgeman (Hebrew: שלמה "סמי" תורג'מן; born July 11, 1964) is a Major General in the IDF reserves and is a former commander of the IDF Southern Command. His other past posts include: commander of the Israeli Ground Forces, head of the Armored Corps and head of the Operations Division of the Operations Directorate. He was previously commander of the Pillar of Fire Reserves Formation in the Northern Command.

== Biography ==
Turgeman was born in Marrakesh, Morocco, and made aliyah with his family when he was half a year old. He grew up in Ashkelon, and lived there until 2004.

In 1982 he was drafted to the IDF and has served the majority of his army service in the Armored Corps. He served as a tank commander in the 14th Brigade, as a platoon commander in the 401st Brigade (the I'kvot Ha'Barzel formation), and as a company commander in the 460th Brigade. In 1992 he was appointed commander of the Battalion 52 of the 401st Brigade. In 1994 he was selected as Operations Officer of the 162nd Division (the Plada formation). In 1996 he served as the commander of a reserves' brigade and as an instructor in a company commander/ battalion commander training course. From 1997 to 1999 he served as head of the training division in the former ground forces command.

Between 1999 and 2001 he served as the commander of the 500th Brigade and following as the commander of the Armored Corps' Training Brigade. In 2003 he was promoted to the rank of Brigadier General and appointed commander the reserve division the Amud Aish formation of the Northern Command. He simultaneously (2004–2005) served as Chief Armored Officer. Following he served as head of the Operations Directorate and between October 2007 and June 2009 he served as commander of the Ga'ash formation.

In September 2009 he was promoted to Maj. General and appointed head of the IDF's Ground Forces Branch.

From 2013 to 2015, he was head of IDF Southern Command

He holds a B.S. of Social Science from Bar Ilan University and a Masters in Business Administration from Tel Aviv University.

He is married and is a father of five.
