= Netanel Lasri =

Israeli military officer (1986–2026)

- נתנאל לסרי
- Born: 1986; Lod, Israel
- Died: 13 June 2026 (aged 40)
- Other name: Nati Lasri
- Children: 3
- Military career
- Branch: Israel Defense Forces
- Service years: 2004–2026
- Rank: Colonel
- Commands: 460th Brigade; 52nd Armored Battalion; 9th Armored Battalion
- Conflicts: 2006 Lebanon War; Operation Hot Winter; First Gaza War; August 2012 Sinai attack; 2012 Gaza War

Netanel Lasri (1986 – 13 June 2026) was an Israeli military officer.

== Early life and military career ==
Lasri was born in Lod in 1986. He attended and graduated from Ramla-Lod Regional High School. In 2004, he enlisted in the Israel Defense Forces, where he served in the 401st Brigade of the Armored Corps of Israel, and was a platoon commander in the 460th Brigade. During the 2006 Lebanon War, he fought as a tank crewman. He served as deputy company commander in Operation Hot Winter in 2008, and was a battalion operation officer during the First Gaza War from 2008 to 2009. For his service during the August 2012 Sinai attack, he received a certificate of appreciation from the commander of Gaza Division, and for his service during the 2012 Gaza War, he received a certificate of excellence from the Chief of Staff.

In 2015, Lasri was appointed deputy commander of the 52nd Armored Battalion. From 2019 to 2021, he commanded the 9th Armored Battalion, and was a division officer of the 162nd Division. In 2023, he was appointed commander of the Golan and Hermon Brigades, serving until 2024, and in 2025, he served as head of planning of the Israeli Ground Forces. After his diagnosis with cancer, he retired from his military service.

== Personal life and death ==
Lasri was married, and had three children with his wife. Their marriage lasted until Lasri's death in 2026.

In 2024, Lasri was diagnosed with cancer. He died from the disease on 13 July 2026, at the age of 40.
