= 2025 Gaza City offensive =

Israeli military operation during the Gaza war

- Part of the Israeli invasion of the Gaza Strip during the Gaza war
Date	Initial stages: 20 August 2025 (Note: On 20 August, the IDF spokesman Brigadier General Effie Defrin announced the start of "the preliminary operations and the first stages of the attack on Gaza City". The IDF had nonetheless already been operating within parts of the city prior to the announcement, having launched an offensive into the Shuja'iyya neighborhood since 4 April and an incursion into the Sabra neighborhood since 18 August.) – 15 September 2025 (3 weeks and 5 days) Main offensive: 15 September (Note: On the night of 15 September, The Jerusalem Post received "off-record confirmation" that the main offensive had begun. On the morning of 16 September, the IDF formally confirmed the start of the main offensive.) – 4 October 2025 (2 weeks and 5 days)
Location	Gaza City and Jabalia, Gaza Strip, Palestine
Result	Inconclusive (see aftermath)
Territorial changes	Israel withdraws from parts of Gaza City on 10 October

Belligerents
Israel	Hamas; Palestinian Islamic Jihad; Popular Resistance Committees; Palestinian Mujahideen Movement; Democratic Front for the Liberation of Palestine; Popular Front for the Liberation of Palestine; Abdul al-Qadir al-Husseini Brigades

Commanders and leaders
(Israel) Eyal Zamir (Israel) Barak Hiram (Israel) Sagiv Dahan (Israel) Moran Omer	(Hamas) Muhammad Rajab (Hamas) Imad Aslim (Hamas) Haitham Khuwajari

Units involved
Israel Defense Forces; Israeli Ground Forces; Northern Command; 36th Division; 7th Brigade; 77th Battalion; 82nd Battalion; 188th Brigade; Central Command; 99th Division; 98th Division; Southern Command; 162nd Division; 401st Brigade; Nahal Brigade; 50th Battalion; Givati Brigade; 607th Battalion; Shaked Battalion; Israeli Air Force; Israeli Intelligence Community; Shin Bet	(Palestine) Palestinian Joint Operations Room; Al-Qassam Brigades; Gaza Brigade; Zeitoun Battalion; Shati Battalion; Al-Quds Brigades; Al-Nasser Salah al-Deen Brigades; Mujahideen Brigades; Gaza Brigade; National Resistance Brigades; Abu Ali Mustafa Brigades; Abdul al-Qadir al-Husseini Brigades

Strength
(Israel) ~130,000 troops	(Hamas) ~10,000 militants (Note: According to estimates by Israeli security officials.)

Casualties and losses
6 soldiers killed	Fewer than 200 militants killed (Note: Including Abu Obaida)
- 450,000 (Note: Per the Palestinian Civil Defense.) – 870,000+ (Note: Per the IDF.) Palestinian civilians displaced Unknown number of Palestinian civilians killed

On 20 August 2025, during the Gaza war, Israel announced it had formally begun the "first stages" of a military offensive aiming to seize control of Gaza City from Hamas, referred to in plans as Operation Gideon's Chariots II or Operation Gideon's Chariots B (Note: In the Hebrew alphabet, the letter Bet (ב) (B in the Latin alphabet), is equivalent to the number two.) (Hebrew: מבצע מרכבות גדעון ב', romanized: Mivtza Merkavat Gid'on B'). These early stages were superseded by an expanded main offensive that began on 15 September. Israel framed the offensive as a continuation or a second part of Operation Gideon's Chariots, which lasted from 16 May to 4 August 2025.

Hamas announced a counter-offensive titled Operation Moses' Staff in response to the Israeli operations. It also allegedly transferred Israeli hostages to combat zones in Gaza City, where they were intended to be used as human shields.

Experts said that the offensive would exacerbate the ongoing humanitarian crisis in the Gaza Strip, with the Integrated Food Security Phase Classification (IPC) having confirmed a famine in Gaza City on 22 August. Israel also warned that unless Hamas yielded to its terms, the city could be destroyed. By 30 September, around 1,250 buildings were reported to have been destroyed in the city, with several residential areas having been destroyed by Israeli bombings.

On 4 October 2025, following a positive response by Hamas to a peace plan and a call by American president Donald Trump for Israel to cease its military advances in the Gaza Strip, the Israel Defense Forces (IDF) has halted on orders of Israeli prime minister Benjamin Netanyahu. Following the implementation of the peace plan's ceasefire on 10 October, Israeli forces withdrew from parts of Gaza City.

== Prelude ==
=== Background ===
The last large scale Israeli operation in Gaza City was a siege that lasted from November 2023 to January 2025. In April 2025, Israel began an offensive into Shuja'iyya, a neighborhood in the city's east. By August 2025, Gaza City was one of only three major population centers still under Palestinian control.

=== Preparations ===
On 4 August 2025, reports emerged that Netanyahu was to lay out a plan to his war cabinet the next day to expand Israeli military occupation across the entire Gaza Strip, including areas where hostages were being held. According to official close to the President, the goal of the operation was to secure a complete surrender from Hamas and the release of all hostages. A three-hour preliminary meeting with Defense Minister Israel Katz, Strategic Affairs Minister Ron Dermer, and IDF operations director and chief of staff Itzik Cohen and Eyal Zamir respectively, took place on 5 August, during which Zamir laid out several options regarding the war in Gaza. Zamir was opposed to Netanyahu's insistence on a full-scale occupation, warning that it would leave the IDF as well as the hostages vulnerable. The full cabinet meeting to decide the course of action was postponed until 7 August.

Netanyahu met opposition leader Yair Lapid on 6 August to discuss the occupation plan. Lapid reportedly told him that "occupying Gaza is a very bad idea" and would likely lead to the deaths of the hostages. Netanyahu further elaborated on his plan during a Fox News interview on 7 August, claiming that Israel was intent on capturing the Strip but that it would not annex or govern it, instead handing it over to an administration from other Arab states. Later in the day, the cabinet convened at 6:00 p.m. local time, in a meeting which lasted 10 hours and stretched into 8 August in Israel.

On 8 August 2025, Israel's security cabinet approved a plan to take over Gaza City.

Ahead of the offensive, Israel announced plans to relocate Palestinian civilians in Gaza City to the southern Gaza Strip, with the deadline for evacuation set for 7 October 2025, and intensified bombardments on the Gaza City neighborhoods of Zeitoun, Sabra, Rimal, and Tuffah.

On 18 August, the IDF advanced into Sabra, and laid siege to a school and a United Nations (UN) clinic.

On 20 August, Israeli defense minister Israel Katz approved the plans for the takeover of Gaza City. The IDF announced it would be calling up 60,000 reservists for the offensive.

== Offensive ==
=== August ===
==== 20 August ====
- IDF spokesman Brigadier General Effie Defrin stated that Israel had "begun the preliminary operations and the first stages of the attack on Gaza City" and that the IDF was presently holding positions on the city's outskirts. Furthermore, an Israeli military official stated that the IDF would seek to breach areas of Gaza City where they had not previously operated in.

==== 21 August ====
- Israel struck targets throughout Gaza City, while residents reported that the Sabra and Shuja'iyya neighborhoods were being shelled. The IDF reported they were operating in Zeitoun, the city's southernmost neighborhood, and in Jabalia, north of the city.

==== 22 August ====
- Hamas's al-Qassam Brigades attacked and wounded an IDF soldier in Zeitoun. Meanwhile, Israeli forces reached the central parts of Sabra.

==== 24 August ====
- Israeli tanks advanced into the Saftawy neighborhood of Jabalia to take up positions adjacent to Jalaa Street, which separates western and eastern Gaza City.

==== 27 August ====
- The al-Quds Brigades of Palestinian Islamic Jihad (PIJ) reported that they destroyed an Israeli military vehicle in Sabra with an explosive.

==== 29 August ====
- In Zeitoun, seven IDF soldiers were wounded by an explosive device. The neighborhood was also the site of a "major security incident", with speculation that some IDF soldiers might have been captured by the al-Qassam Brigades. Militants also carried out an ambush in Sabra.

==== 30 August ====
- The IDF reportedly withdrew from Zeitoun as a result of the previous clashes in the neighborhood. The IDF's Arabic-language spokesman Avichay Adraee said that reports of the supposed kidnapping of missing Israeli soldiers were false. Following "intensive search efforts", the soldiers were located and recovered alive. The Shin Bet carried out a drone strike in Gaza City that targeted the al-Qassam Brigades spokesman Abu Obeida. Israel says he was killed, however Hamas did not comment on the claim until they confirmed his death later that year.

=== September ===
==== 1 September ====
- Residents of Sheikh Radwan said Israeli forces sent old armored vehicles into the eastern parts of their neighborhood and then blew them up remotely, destroying several homes.

==== 3 September ====
- Hamas announced the start of a counter-offensive in Gaza City titled "Operation Moses' Staff".

==== 4 September ====
- The IDF declared control over 40% of Gaza City.

==== 5 September ====
- The IDF began flattening multiple high-rise buildings in Gaza City, saying they were being used by Hamas for military purposes. Israeli military vehicles west of the Jabalia refugee camp were struck by pre-laid explosives set by al-Qassam Brigades militants.

==== 8 September ====
- Al-Qassam Brigades militants attacked an IDF outpost between Jabalia and Sheikh Radwan, using an explosive device to kill four soldiers inside a tank; at least one militant was killed by return fire.

==== 9 September ====
- Israel ordered the entire population of Gaza City to evacuate to the al-Mawasi area.

==== 13 September ====
- The al-Quds Brigades said its militants destroyed an Israeli tank with an explosive device in Sheikh Radwan, and repelled an infiltration attempt by Israeli special forces south of Gaza City.

==== 14 September ====
- The IDF stated it completed preparations for the next phase of the offensive.

==== 15 September ====
- The IDF launched the main offensive to occupy Gaza City.

==== 16 September ====
- The Aybaki Mosque was hit from an Israeli aircraft and destroyed together with at least 16 of the city's residential buildings.

==== 17 September ====
- Israeli forces advanced in Sheikh Radwan, Tel al-Hawa, and Shuja'iyya.

==== 19 September ====
- The National Resistance Brigades of the Democratic Front for the Liberation of Palestine (DFLP) reported the capture of two Israeli drones that were flying above Sheikh Radwan and Tuffah. It was reported that the IDF paused some underground operations, suspecting that hostages may be held in tunnels under Gaza City and military actions may endanger their lives.

==== 22 September ====
- The Gaza Health Ministry (GHM) said two Gaza City hospitals, the al-Rantissi Children's Hospital and the Eye Hospital, have been taken out of service as a result of Israeli attacks.

==== 23 September ====
- The IDF reportedly completed an encirclement of Gaza City, fully occupying Sheikh Radwan, Sabra, Tel al-Hawa, and the coastline.

==== 24 September ====
- The IDF published aerial footage of gunfire coming from a building, saying it shows Al-Qassam Brigades militants firing from inside the al-Shifa Hospital. Hamas denied the report.

==== 26 September ====
- The IDF said troops in Gaza City foiled an attempted suicide bombing against them by calling in an airstrike on the suspect.

==== 27 September ====
- The IDF reportedly achieved operational control over more than half of Gaza City. Israeli airstrikes and shelling targeted homes in Gaza City belonging to the Dogmush and Bakar clans. These appear to have been retaliatory attacks as a result of the clans rejecting earlier Shin Bet proposals to collaborate with Israel and receive governance over parts of Gaza.

==== 29 September ====
- Al-Qassam Brigades militants infiltrated an Israeli military position and attacked forces there, resulting in the wounding of 11 Israeli soldiers and the killing of at least two militants. The Brigades also reportedly attacked Israeli forces that had stationed themselves inside a Catholic school in Tel al-Hawa.

=== October ===
==== 4 October ====
- The IDF's offensive was halted on Netanyahu's orders, following a positive response by Hamas to a ceasefire proposal and a call by President Donald Trump for Israel to stop bombing the Gaza Strip. According to Israeli Army Radio, the order called for operations to be reduced to "the minimum", with troops on the ground strictly carrying out defensive maneuvers, and was issued after overnight talks between Israeli and American officials. IDF troops maintained their positions in Gaza City, neither advancing nor withdrawing, but IDF airstrikes continued, though at a significantly reduced scale.

== Humanitarian crisis ==
=== Forced displacement ===
Conflicting reports emerged about the scale of civilian evacuations from Gaza City. Mustafa Qazzaat, head of the emergency committee in the Gaza municipality, described the situation as "catastrophic", with "large numbers" fleeing eastern neighborhoods. Associated Press (AP) journalists witnessed "small groups" heading south from the city in the week leading up to the offensive, but no large-scale evacuation. The New Arab described a "unified" reaction from residents of Gaza City, with families choosing to remain in their homes due to feeling there was no safe place in all of the Gaza Strip. Al-Monitor reported that fleeing residents were mostly heading towards the coast. As of 19 September, the Palestinian Civil Defense (PCD) in Gaza says 450,000 Gazans have fled the city, while as of October, the IDF says the number is more than 870,000.

According to Ahed Ferwana, a Gaza-based political analyst, Operation Gideon's Chariots II was not only a military maneuever but also a continuation of an Israeli demographic engineering strategy that aimed to create the conditions for permanent displacement of Gazans.

According to a report in Haaretz, the IDF's Military Advocate General warned the IDF Chief of Staff, Eyal Zamir, that the evacuation orders for Gaza City contradicted Israeli and international law because the necessary conditions for receiving the population do not exist. This position was also supported by the Research Department in the Military Intelligence Directorate. The areas marked as zones for taking in residents were already filled to capacity, and the area allotted per person under the Chief of Staff's plan was significantly smaller than international-law standards. Despite the warnings, the Chief of Staff ignored the position of the Military Advocate General.

On 1 October, Katz stated that it was the "last opportunity" for Palestinians to evacuate Gaza City and that anyone who remains will be considered "terrorists and terror supporters". Hundreds of thousands of residents nonetheless remained, mostly because they could not afford to leave or were too weak to make the journey to tent camps in the south.

=== Famine ===
On 22 August, the IPC confirmed that a famine was occurring in Gaza City and said it could spread south to Deir al-Balah and Khan Yunis by September. Israel disputed the report.

The IPC said that three "thresholds" that indicate famine in the city were met, namely starvation, malnutrition, and mortality. At least 1 in 5 households faced an extreme shortage in their consumption of food; roughly 1 in 3 children or more were acutely malnourished; and at least 2 in every 10,000 residents were dying daily because of outright starvation or the combination of malnutrition and disease.

=== Razing of Gaza City ===
On 22 August, Katz warned that unless Hamas yields to Israel's terms the city could be destroyed. This threat had begun to be carried out, with residents of Gaza City reporting that the Israeli military was systematically razing parts of the city to the ground. One resident reported: "There is hardly any fighting going on, but heavy artillery and bulldozers are moving from one street to the other, destroying all of these residential clusters". Mondoweiss reported that Israel had hired private contractors who used bulldozers to destroy entire neighbourhoods.

On 17 September, Israeli finance minister Bezalel Smotrich said Gaza City was a "real estate bonanza", and that its demolition would make way for a rebuilding and renewal. Despite statements by Israeli government leaders, IDF officials told reporters that there was no policy to completely raze Gaza City neighborhoods.

=== Israeli hostages ===
On 17 August, it was reported that Hamas and Palestinian Islamic Jihad (PIJ) were considering a plan to transfer Israeli hostages to Gaza City in order to deter the offensive. On 29 August, Abu Obeida confirmed that hostages had been transferred to combat zones.

On 5 September, Hamas published a new video of two Israeli hostages held in Gaza City, Guy Gilboa-Dalal and Alon Ohel. The video, purportedly filmed on 28 August, was rare in that it was filmed above ground, showing Gilboa-Dalal and Ohel being driven around the city in a car. According to statements made by Gilboa-Dalal, at least eight other hostages were being held in Gaza City, and the Israeli offensive endangered all of their lives. Reportedly, Palestinian sources within Gaza informed Israeli Public Broadcasting Corporation (Kan) that the hostages are being held above ground in tents and residences with the aim of restricting Israeli forces from operating in certain areas.

On 17 September, it was reported that Israeli security officials privately informed the families of hostages that they lack specific information on their current locations. On 18 September, Hamas clarified that the Gaza City offensive means that Israel will not receive any hostages, dead or alive, comparing their fate to that of Ron Arad. On 22 September, Hamas released a new video showing Alon Ohel, who appeared to be losing vision in his right eye.

On 28 September, the al-Qassam Brigades announced "the loss of contact" with two hostages, Matan Angrest and Omri Miran, during Israeli attacks on Sabra and Tel al-Hawa. The Brigades demanded that Israel halt air sorties in those areas for 24 hours so that it could locate the missing hostages.

== Ceasefire debate ==
=== August ===
A 60-day ceasefire plan presented by Egyptian and Qatari mediators on 17 August was accepted by Hamas, and would have halted the offensive if accepted by the Israeli side. Netanyahu did not respond publicly to the ceasefire proposal, and his far-right political allies heavily pressured him to reject it.

On 31 August, an Israeli security cabinet meeting was convened during which all defense officials argued in favor of "a limited hostage release deal" and stated that a military takeover of Gaza City would not bring victory over Hamas.

=== September ===
On 7 September, Trump stated that Israel had accepted his new proposal for a ceasefire and that Hamas must accept it as well. It was unclear what the terms of the proposed ceasefire were. In response to Trump's statement, Hamas said it:

" [...] is ready to immediately sit at the negotiating table to discuss the release of all prisoners in exchange for a clear declaration to end the war, a total withdrawal from the Gaza Strip, and creation of a committee of independent Palestinians to run the Gaza Strip."

However, the 9 September Israeli airstrike in Qatar, which targeted Hamas leaders that had gathered to discuss the American proposal, appeared to derail any prospect of an agreement.

On 26 September, Trump again stated he was close to forging a deal to end the war and return the Israeli hostages, without revealing any details or timetable. A day later, Hamas said it had not received any plan from Trump. The detailed peace plan was revealed on 29 September: it would include an immediate ceasefire along existing battle lines; the disarmament of Hamas; the release of all Israeli hostages; and "eventual" Palestinian independence. Netanyahu agreed to the deal, but a senior Hamas official stated that some of its points are unacceptable and must be amended, and that an official response would only come after consultations with other Palestinian factions.

=== October ===
On 3 October, Hamas announced it agreed to some of the terms, including the release of all the hostages, but did not clearly state whether it agreed to disarm and stated it was seeking further negotiations. Hamas also stated it was ready to hand over power in Gaza: "to a Palestinian body of independents (technocrats) based on Palestinian national consensus and supported by Arab and Islamic backing".

Following Hamas' response, Trump stated that he believed the group was "ready for a lasting peace", and called on Israel to stop bombing Gaza. On 4 October, in response to Trump's statement, Netanyahu ordered the IDF to stop the Gaza City offensive.

== Aftermath ==
=== Post-offensive fighting ===
Despite the end of the offensive on 4 October, some fighting between the IDF and Hamas forces continued taking place in Gaza City. The IDF itself said that all of northern Gaza, including the city, was still considered "a dangerous combat zone".

Hours after the offensive was paused, the IDF launched an airstrike on Tuffah that reportedly targeted a Hamas operative and killed 18 Palestinians. On 6 October, the al-Qassam Brigades said they shelled IDF positions in Tel al-Hawa. On 8 October, the IDF said that al-Qassam Brigades gunmen had attempted to raid an army encampment in the southern outskirts of the city, near the Netzarim Corridor, with Israeli forces repelling the attack. On 9 October, an al-Qassam Brigades sniper killed an IDF soldier in Gaza City.

=== Ceasefire implementation ===
Following the implementation of a ceasefire in the Gaza Strip on 10 October, Israeli forces withdrew from parts of Gaza City. IDF troops remained deployed in Shuja'iyya. Thousands of Palestinians also returned to the city and surrounding areas.

== Reactions ==
=== Countries ===
- Australia: Foreign minister Penny Wong said, at the time of its planning, that the offensive would worsen the Gaza humanitarian crisis and constitute a violation of international law, calling for a ceasefire, the return of Israeli hostages, the entry of aid, and a two-state solution.
- Germany: Germany announced that it would stop exporting military equipment to Israel that could be used in the Gaza Strip.
- Saudi Arabia, Jordan, and Turkey: These countries condemned the offensive at the time of its planning.
- Spain, Ireland, Iceland, Luxembourg, Malta, Norway, Portugal, and Slovenia: These countries issued a joint letter condemning the offensive at the time of its planning, stating it would deepen the humanitarian crisis and endanger the lives of Israeli hostages. The letter also called for a ceasefire and two-state solution.
- United Kingdom: James Kariuki, the British deputy permanent representative to the United Nations, stated, at the time of its planning, that the offensive was "not a path to resolution" and instead "a path to more bloodshed".
- United States: President Donald Trump supported Israel's Gaza offensive plan and called for Hamas to be "confronted and destroyed" as soon as possible. Dorothy Shea, the American interim ambassador to the UN, said that: "Israel has a right to decide what is necessary for its security, and what measures are appropriate to end the threat posed by Hamas and other similar groups".
- Vatican City: Pope Leo XIV stated that Gazans, who were being "forced once again to leave their lands", were experiencing "unacceptable conditions". On 17 September, he spoke by phone with Father Gabriel Romanelli, pastor of the Holy Family Church in Gaza City, "to assure him of his prayers and closeness".

=== Palestinian factions and groups ===
- Hamas: The militant group released a statement condemning the Israeli offensive as "a blatant disregard for the efforts made by the mediators”, referring to the Egyptian-Qatari ceasefire proposal it had accepted. Hamas also called Katz's comments about razing Gaza City "a confession of committing a crime that amounts to ethnic cleansing" and stated it would not disarm without the creation of an independent Palestinian state.
- Palestinian Authority (PA): President Mahmoud Abbas called Israel's decision to capture Gaza City a "complete crime that represents a continuation of the policy of genocide, systematic killing, starvation and siege, and a flagrant violation of international humanitarian law and U.N. resolutions".
- Gazan Christian community: On 26 August, the Greek Orthodox Patriarchate of Jerusalem and the Latin Patriarchate of Jerusalem issued a joint statement announcing that their clergy and nuns would not evacuate Gaza City and would continue to care for the displaced Gazans sheltering on their properties.

=== Within Israel ===
- Israeli protestors: Tens of thousands of Israeli protestors began demonstrating against the offensive, at the time of its planning, and believe they endanger the Israeli hostages held in Gaza. The Hostages and Missing Families Forum stated on Twitter that "expanding the fighting endangers the hostages and the soldiers — the people of Israel are not willing to risk them!" Following the start of the main offensive on 15 September, the organization issued a statement of condemnation and said Netanyahu would bear personal responsibility for the fate of the hostages.
- Israeli opposition: Yair Lapid said, at the time of its planning, that the offensive was a far-right plot that would be a disaster for the IDF and Israel and cause the deaths of the remaining hostages. Yair Golan, leader of The Democrats, called it a “death sentence to hostages and more bereaved families.”

== See also ==
- Gaza Strip evacuations
- Gaza Strip under Hamas
- Battle of Khan Yunis (2025)
- Gaza genocide
