= Eyal Zamir =

Chief of the General Staff of the Israel Defense Forces

- אֱיָל זָמִיר
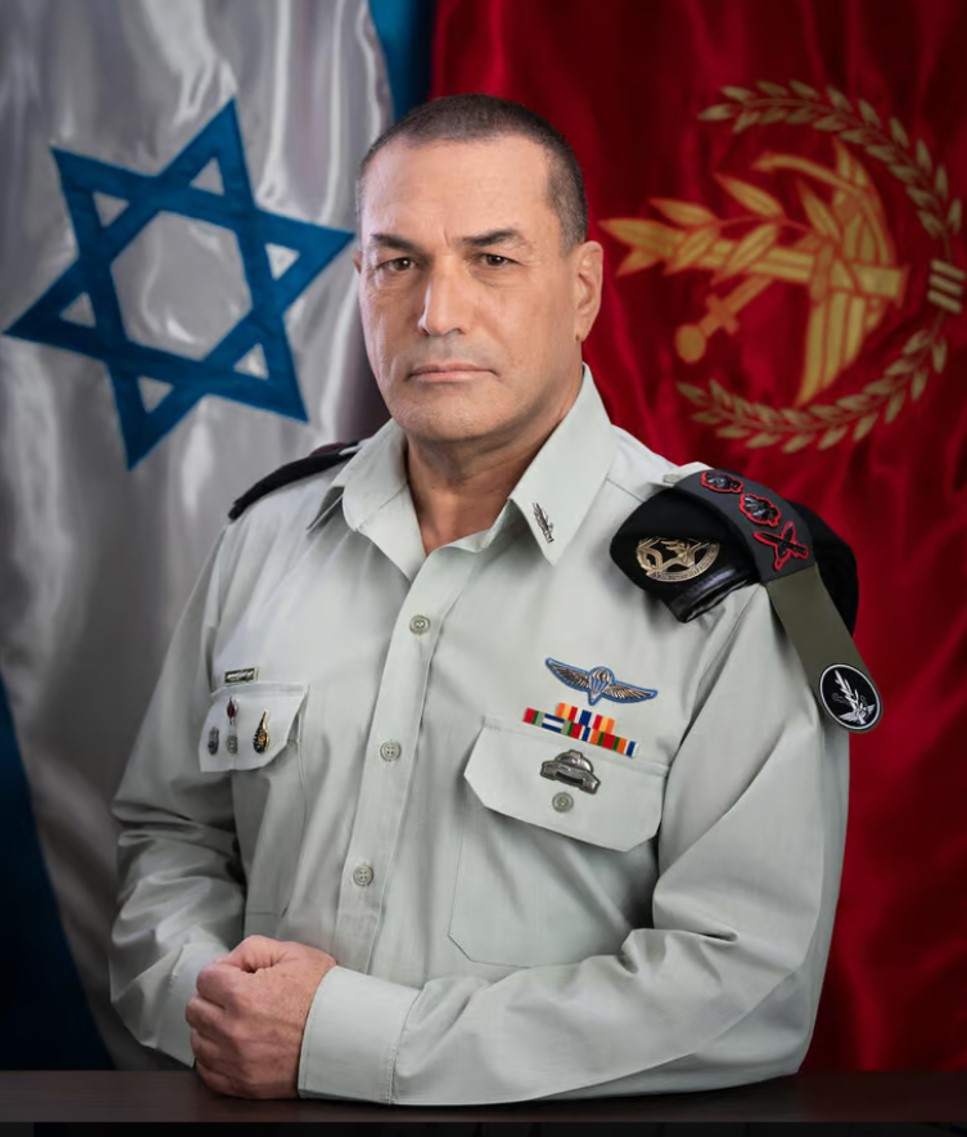
- Official portrait, 2025
- Born: 26 January 1966 (age 60); Eilat, Israel
- Education: Tel Aviv University; University of Haifa
- Military career
- Allegiance: Israel
- Branch: Israeli Ground Forces
- Service years: 1984–
- Rank: Rav Aluf (Chief of the General Staff)
- Conflicts: Arab–Israeli conflict; Israeli–Lebanese conflict; South Lebanon conflict (1985–2000); 2006 Lebanon War; Israeli–Palestinian conflict; First Intifada; Second Intifada; Operation Cast Lead; Operation Pillar of Defense; Operation Protective Edge; Operation Guardian of the Walls; Gaza war; 2026 Iran war

Eyal Zamir (Hebrew: אֱיָל זָמִיר; born 26 January 1966) is an Israeli military officer who is the current chief of the general staff of the Israel Defense Forces, having taken office on 5 March 2025. Zamir previously served as the director-general of the Israeli Ministry of Defense (2023–2025), as deputy chief of staff between 2018 and 2021, commander of the Southern Command, Military Secretary to the Prime Minister, commander of the 36th Division and commander of the 7th Armored Brigade.

== Early life and education ==
Zamir was born and raised in Eilat. He was one of three children born to Shlomo and Yaffa (nee Abadi) Zamir. His grandparents were immigrants from Yemen and Syria. His father was a Lieutenant Colonel in the IDF who decided to settle in Eilat after being stationed there. He is a graduate of the 17th class of the Military Command Boarding School, a preparatory boarding school in Tel Aviv, which he entered in 1980 at age 14. Unlike his peers who were aiming for elite commando units, Zamir dreamed of joining the Armored Corps, recalling "I was a young boy from Eilat who used to read a lot of books, and when I read about the Yom Kippur War I would always see that the Armored Corps – the tanks and whatnot – were saving the day. I was the only one who wanted to go in that direction."

Zamir is a graduate of the Inter-Service Command and Staff College, and the National Security College. He holds a bachelor's degree in political science from Tel Aviv University, a Master's degree in national security from the University of Haifa, and is an alumnus of the General Management Program for Senior Executives (GMP) of The Wharton School.

Zamir is married to Orna and has three children, sons Ori and Itai and daughter Roni. He lives in Hod HaSharon.

== Career ==
Zamir began his service in the IDF in 1984, joining the Armored Corps. In the Armored Corps he underwent training as a combat soldier and later attended the tank commander course. He completed an armored officers course and was a platoon commander and company commander in the 500th Brigade and the 460th Brigade.

In 1992–1994, he served as the operations officer of the 7th Armored Brigade (with the rank of major). From 1994 to 1996 he served as the commander of the 75th Battalion in the 7th Brigade (with the rank of Lieutenant Colonel). In 1996, he was a commander of the tank commanders course at the armored school. He served in this position until 1997, when he went on to study for a year at the École Militaire in France.

In 1998–2000, he served as an operations officer of the 162nd Division. In 2000–2002, he was head of the Armored Corps Theory Department at the headquarters of the Chief Armored Officer, and at the same time served as commander of the 656th Brigade, a reserve division in the Central Command (with the rank of colonel). In 2002–2003, he was commander of the Tactical Training Center at the National Training Center on land, in parallel with his role as commander of the reserve division.

In 2003–2005, he was commander of the 7th Armored Brigade. In 2007–2009, he served as commander of the 143rd Division (with the rank of brigadier general), and at the same time commanded a course for company commanders and battalion commanders.

In June 2009, he was appointed commander of the 36th Division. In July 2011, he was replaced by Tamir Hayman.

In November 2012, he was appointed the Military Secretary to the Prime Minister. On 3 September 2015, he ended his term as the Prime Minister's military secretary. On 14 October 2015, he took office as Commander of the Southern Command. Towards the end of his term, clashes began on the Israel-Gaza Strip border. On 6 June 2018, he ended his term as Commander of the Southern Command.

Zamir appeared alongside Aviv Kohavi, Yair Golan and Nitzan Alon on the 2018 shortlist to replace then chief of staff Gadi Eisenkot. Kochavi was ultimately appointed to the post, with Zamir becoming Deputy Chief of Staff, a position he held until 11 July 2021, after which he retired from the IDF and spent a period of time in the United States as a visiting research fellow at the Washington Institute for Near East Policy.

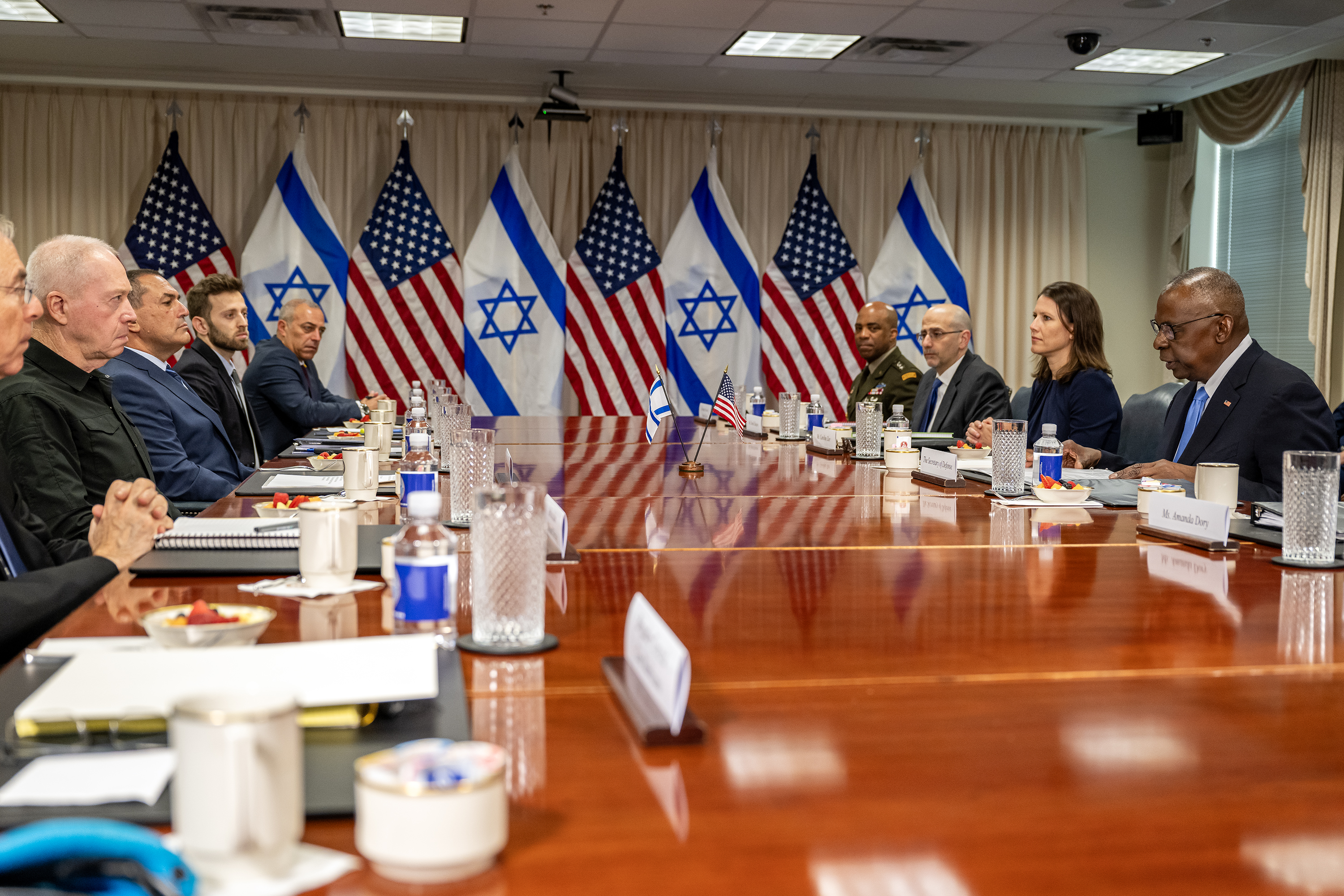
Eyal Zamir and Yoav Gallant with U.S. Secretary of Defense Lloyd Austin at the Pentagon in Washington, D.C., 25 June 2024

On 13 June 2022, Defence Minister Benny Gantz commenced the process of selecting Israel's 23rd IDF Chief of Staff. Zamir was announced as one of three candidates along with Herzi Halevi and Yoel Strick. On 17 July 2022, Gantz announced that the race is between Zamir and Halevi. Halevi was chosen over Zamir in September and assumed office in January,

On 2 January 2023, he was appointed director general of the Ministry of Defense by Yoav Gallant.

After Halevi announced his intention to step down as Chief of Staff in January 2025, Defense Minister Israel Katz cited Zamir, alongside Amir Baram and Tamir Yadai as the three candidates to replace him. Zamir was announced as Halevi's replacement on 1 February 2025. He took the office on 5 March at 16:00, following a ceremony that was held at the Israeli Air Force command center at HaKirya in Tel Aviv.

Under his leadership as Chief of Staff, the IDF launched a major offensive in Gaza in May 2025 (codenamed "Gideon's Chariots"), with the stated goal of capturing 75% of the territory within two months to pressure Hamas; by mid-2025, Israeli sources reported the IDF had achieved or approached control of approximately 75% of Gaza, which contributed to conditions for partial hostage negotiations.

In 2025, during the ongoing Gaza war, Zamir publicly urged members of Israel’s security cabinet to consider approving a proposed hostage-ceasefire agreement with Hamas, suggesting that the IDF's operations created conditions necessary for such a deal and that the decision lay with the political leadership. According to reporting, he objected expanding military operations and told ministers that at that stage doing so could endanger remaining hostages.

Zamir led the IDF during Operation Rising Lion in June 2025, a 12-day campaign involving strikes on Iran's nuclear facilities and other targets. He later conducted debriefs on the operation in preparation for subsequent actions.

Zamir was one of 37 Israelis indicted by the Public Prosecutor of Turkey in 2025 on charges of genocide and crimes against humanity for his involvement in the Gaza war. The Israeli government rejected the charges.

In 2026, Zamir was involved in a major joint Israeli-U.S. military campaign against Iran (Operation Roaring Lion) that included coordinated strikes on Iranian military and nuclear‑related infrastructure. The operation resulted in the death of Iranian Supreme Leader Ali Khamenei.

On 13 July 2026, in response to passing of the Torah Study law as one of Israel's Basic Laws, Zamir wrote a letter to Prime Minister Benjamin Netanyahu, Israel Katz, and Knesset Foreign Affairs and Defense Committee chair Boaz Bismuth, denouncing the bill as “clearly and unequivocally inconsistent with the IDF’s needs”, and saying “It is inconceivable that the military system under my command, which demands unprecedented sacrifice from its personnel, would be party to granting mass exemptions from prosecution," referring to the exemption of Haredi men from the draft. Zamir's condemnation of the law drew support from one of Netanyahu's primary rivals in the October 2026 elections, Gadi Eisenkot, himself a former chief of the IDF. This came following Zamir's March 2026 comments saying that the IDF would "collapse in on itself" without an addition to its manpower.

== Awards and decorations ==
Eyal Zamir has the following three campaign ribbons:

Security zone in Lebanon	Second Lebanon War	Operation Protective Edge

In 2025, Zamir was ranked No. 4 on The Jerusalem Post's annual list of the 50 Most Influential Jews, recognizing his leadership in major military operations.
