= Military Command Boarding School (Israel) =

Israeli Military academy

The Military Command Boarding School is a pre-military educational institution for training youth in their high school years, under boarding school conditions, to command combat field units in the Israel Defense Forces. Graduates of the boarding schools are designated for positions as company commanders in the IDF's field units.

The two military command boarding schools operating in the 2020s are the Military Command Boarding School next to the Reali School in Haifa and the Military Command Boarding School Or Etzion in Merkaz Shapira. In the past, another military boarding school operated in the Glilot area, whose students studied at the Herzliya Hebrew Gymnasium.

== History ==
After the Israeli War of Independence, a manpower crisis began in the Israel Defense Forces (IDF). To address the crisis, the IDF turned to the education system, and despite its success in establishing the academic reserve, it encountered resistance to introducing a military curriculum into high schools in the country. The idea of military boarding schools was discussed in the early 1950s, but was opposed by the Ministry of Education. In light of this, the Training Department of the IDF contacted Joseph Bentwich, director of the upper division of the Reali School in Beit Biram in Haifa, and in March 1952, after extensive correspondence, Bentwich expressed in a letter to Chief of Staff Yigael Yadin his willingness to establish a military boarding school near Beit Biram. Despite this willingness, Bentwich expressed many objections to the boarding school, and only after a conversation with Defense Minister David Ben-Gurion did he agree to establish the boarding school. On 10 October 1953, the first class began, and the official initiation ceremony took place on 22 October 1953.

The military boarding school in Haifa was founded in the name of Aharon Biram, son of Arthur Biram, a graduate of the Reali School and an Air Force pilot, who was killed in the line of duty in 1951.

The first commander of the boarding school was Major Zvi Zellner, who designed the patterns of its activity. In 1965, another boarding school was established in Tel Aviv-Yafo at the Glilot Camps, where the students studied at Herzliya Hebrew Gymnasium. In the 1980s, a religious military boarding school was established in combination with studies at Yeshiva Or Etzion in Merkaz Shapira.

The military boarding school in Tel Aviv operated until its closure in 1984, and over the years, 16 classes completed their education there.

In 1992, a decision was made to transform the military boarding school in Haifa into a pre-military college, where graduates, who chose to do so, remained within the framework of the boarding school and pursued academic studies towards a bachelor's degree at the University of Haifa for two years, after which they were drafted into full military service. This program continued until 1997, after which the boarding school returned to the format of regular high school studies.

Starting with the 19th class (1999–2003), women are also educated at the boarding school. As of January 2024, 17 female boarding school graduates have reached the positions of company commander at least.

In 2007 it was decided to subordinate the military boarding schools to the Inter-Services Command and Staff College.

In the second decade of the 21st century, Chief of Staff Gadi Eisenkot decided to close the boarding schools, as part of the multi-year Gideon reform plan, and after it was claimed that the benefits derived from the boarding schools did not justify their cost. In December 2015, Defense Minister, Moshe Ya'alon, approved a decision to stop accepting new students to the two military boarding schools, thus leading to their closure.

The "Quietly and Safety" Association of Boarding School Graduates worked to prevent the closure of the boarding schools, while compiling historical data on the impact of boarding school graduates on the IDF and the state, and formulating a budgetary solution for the continued operation of the boarding schools. In September 2016, Defense Minister Avigdor Lieberman announced the cancellation of Ya'alon's decision, and that the military boarding school in Haifa would remain active and would be transferred to the responsibility of the Security-Social Division in the Ministry of Defense and run by civilians. The decision was made after an examination of Director General of the Ministry of Defense, Udi Adam. In July 2017 it was decided that the boarding school in Or Etzion would also continue its activities, under the Social Security Division of the Ministry of Defense.

On 30 August 2017 a ceremony was held at Beit Biram to transfer the military boarding school in Haifa to the management of the Ministry of Defense. Starting that year, the staff of the Haifa Command Military Boarding School consists of civilians and Reserve commanders belonging to the staff of the Reali School, which operates the boarding school on behalf of the Ministry of Defense. The boarding school commander is a reserve officer who has served at least as a combat battalion commander.

In 2024, as part of the plans of the committee for regulating the mutual relations between the Ministry of Defense, the IDF, and the military boarding schools, the director of the Erez Program of the Israeli Ground Forces was authorized to accept two areas of activity of the military boarding schools under its responsibility: providing advice on recruiting and marketing the boarding school and helping to accompany the graduates and their recruitment to command and officer positions. Within this framework, it was decided to refresh the insignia worn by the boarding school cadets, with the intention of connecting them to the boarding school's mission and providing updated combat visibility. Outstanding boarding school graduates who choose to serve in the Erez Program are given the option join the program on a shortened track directly through the program's selection series.

== Military Command Preparatory Boarding School in Haifa ==
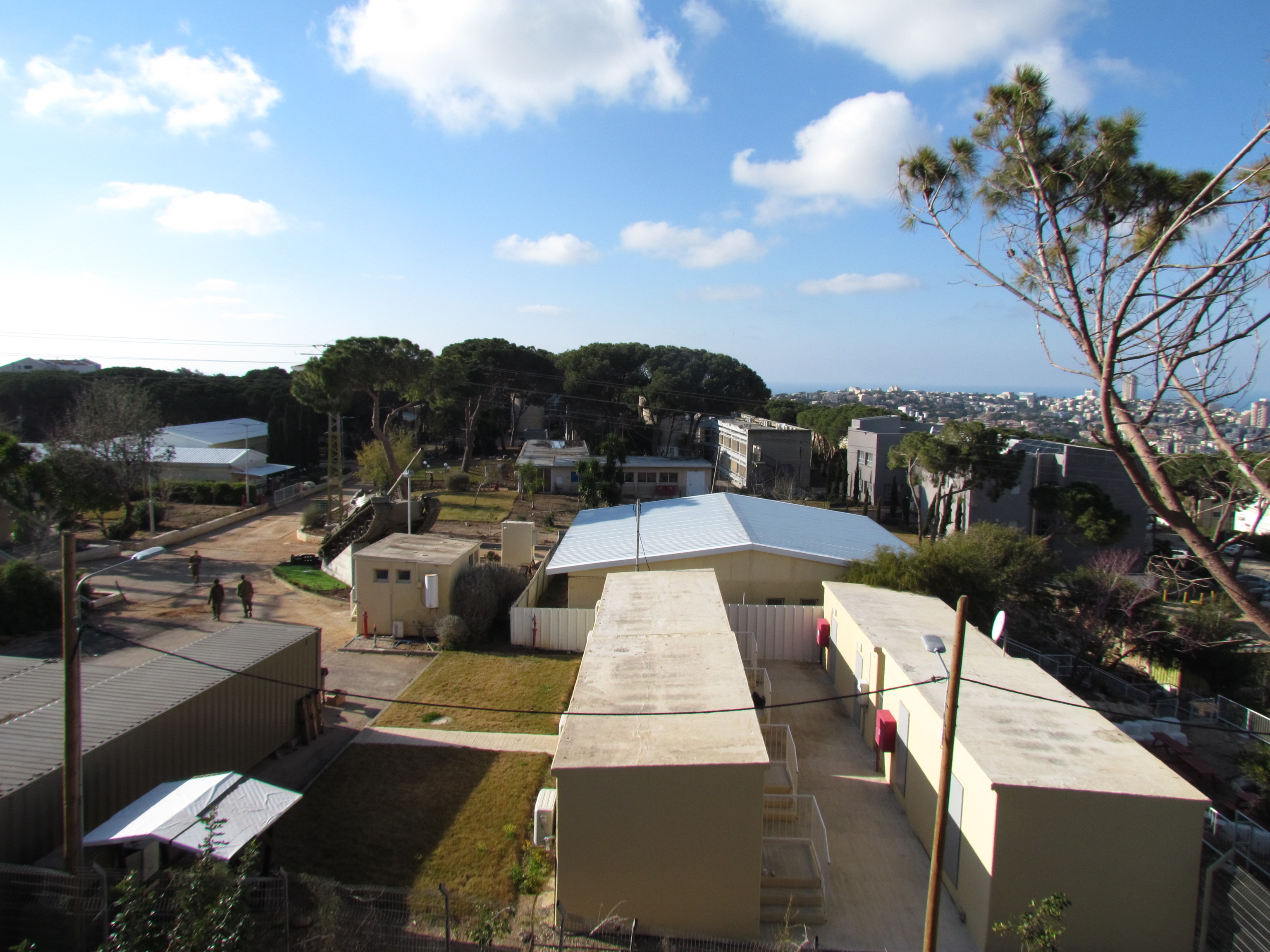
The boarding school complex in Haifa, on the left is the Cadre Tank

The Military Command Boarding School next to the Reali School in Haifa is an educational institution that trains and prepares youth to become commanders in field units in the IDF. Graduates of the boarding school are designated for positions as company commanders in IDF field units and are required to perform a minimum of one year and four months of permanent service, even before their official enlistment into the army.

The boarding school education process begins in the 10th grade, with candidates required to pass a series of selections during the 9th grade, in order to be admitted to the boarding school. The trainees, cadets, study their entire high school education at the Reali School, and graduate with a full Matriculation Certificate.

The motto of the military boarding school is "In quietness and security" and is taken from the Book of Isaiah: "For thus says the Lord Jehovah, the Holy One of Israel, in return and rest, salvation. In quietness and security shall be your strength, and not your father."

Until the beginning of the first decade of the 21st century, the boarding school's students began their studies in the ninth grade, and in their first year they studied at the Ahuza branch of the Reali School.

In 2013, a monument was erected at the military boarding school in memory of the "Cadet Tank" team. It was erected in memory of four graduates of the military boarding school in Haifa, all members of The same class, whose training in the Armored Corps Officers Course was interrupted with the outbreak of the Yom Kippur War, and they were sent to join the fighting on the southern front and were crewed together in the same tank. The four graduates fought bravely and died together in the Battle of the Chinese Farm. After their deaths, the four were promoted to the rank of lieutenant, and received the Chief of Staff Medal.

=== Curriculum ===
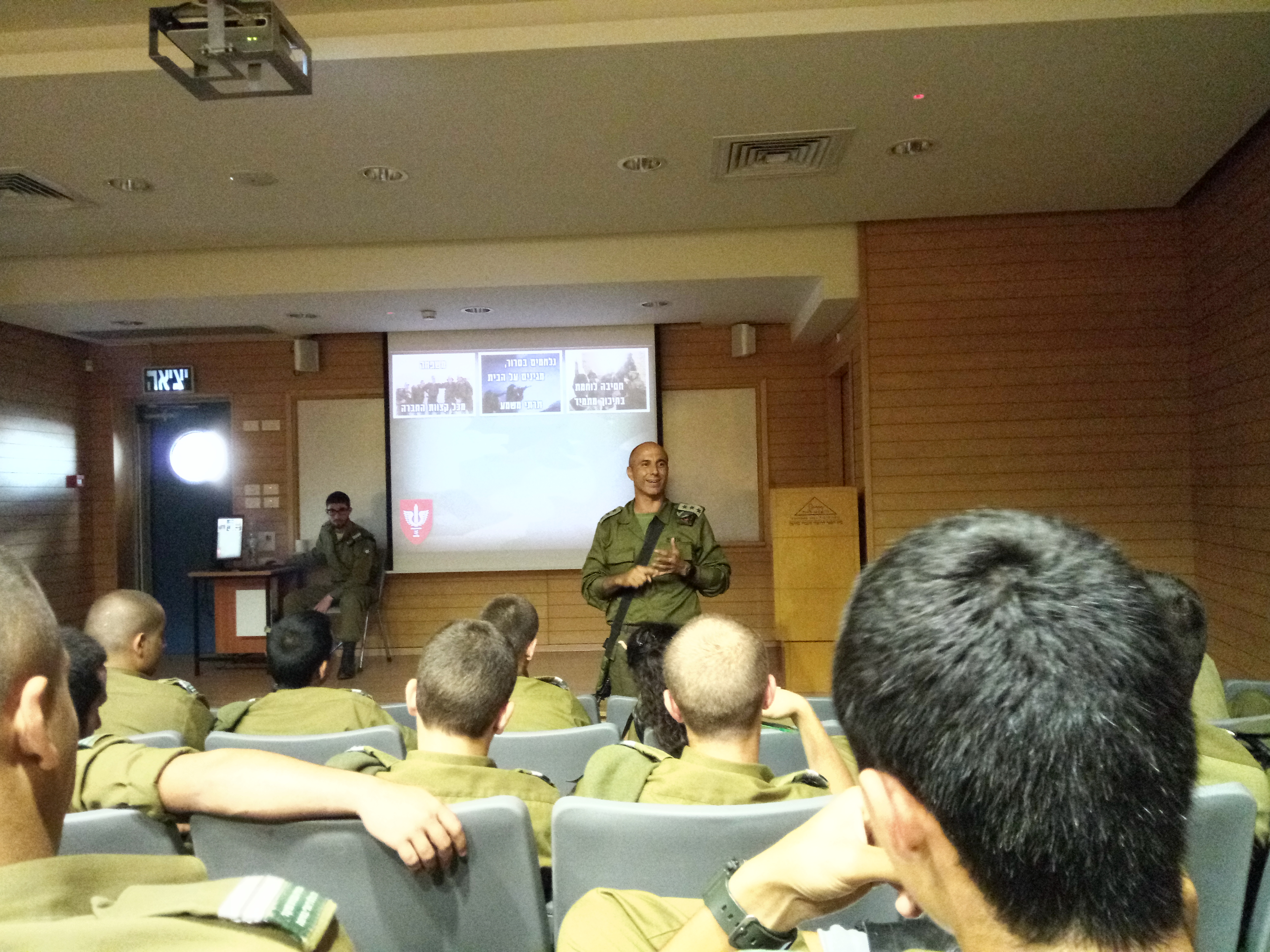
Colonel Zion Razon in conversation with the cadets of the Military Command Boarding School in Haifa

The theoretical studies are studied by the boarding school cadets at the Hebrew Reali School in Haifa, and at the end of their studies they are entitled to a matriculation certificate consisting of approximately 30 study units

In parallel with the theoretical studies at the Real School, the cadets study a 5-unit subject called "Army and Security" which includes three subjects: Land of Israel Studies, Military History, and Fundamentals of Command. At the end of the studies, each boarding school cadet writes a paper Summary on which he is tested.

=== Commanders ===
Below are the names of the commanders of the Military Boarding School in Haifa and their years of service in the position

Commander's Name	Beginning of Term	End of Term
Zvi Zellner	1953	1956
Shmuel Aviad	1957	1958
Yehuda Gavish	1959	1960
Eliyahu Oren	1961	1965
Elhanan Oren	1965	1966
Mordecai Shai	1966	1970
Uri Algom	1970	1973
Oded Shahar	1973	1978
Musak Ben-Ami	1978	1980
Tzvika Rak	1980	1982
Shlomo Asif	1982	1987
Giora Nave	1987	1989
Yehzekiel Panet	1989	1997
Yiftah Guy	1997	2010
Lior Gross	2010	2017
Yedida Hazni	2017	2020
Eran Makov	2020	

== Or Etzion Yeshiva and Military Boarding School ==
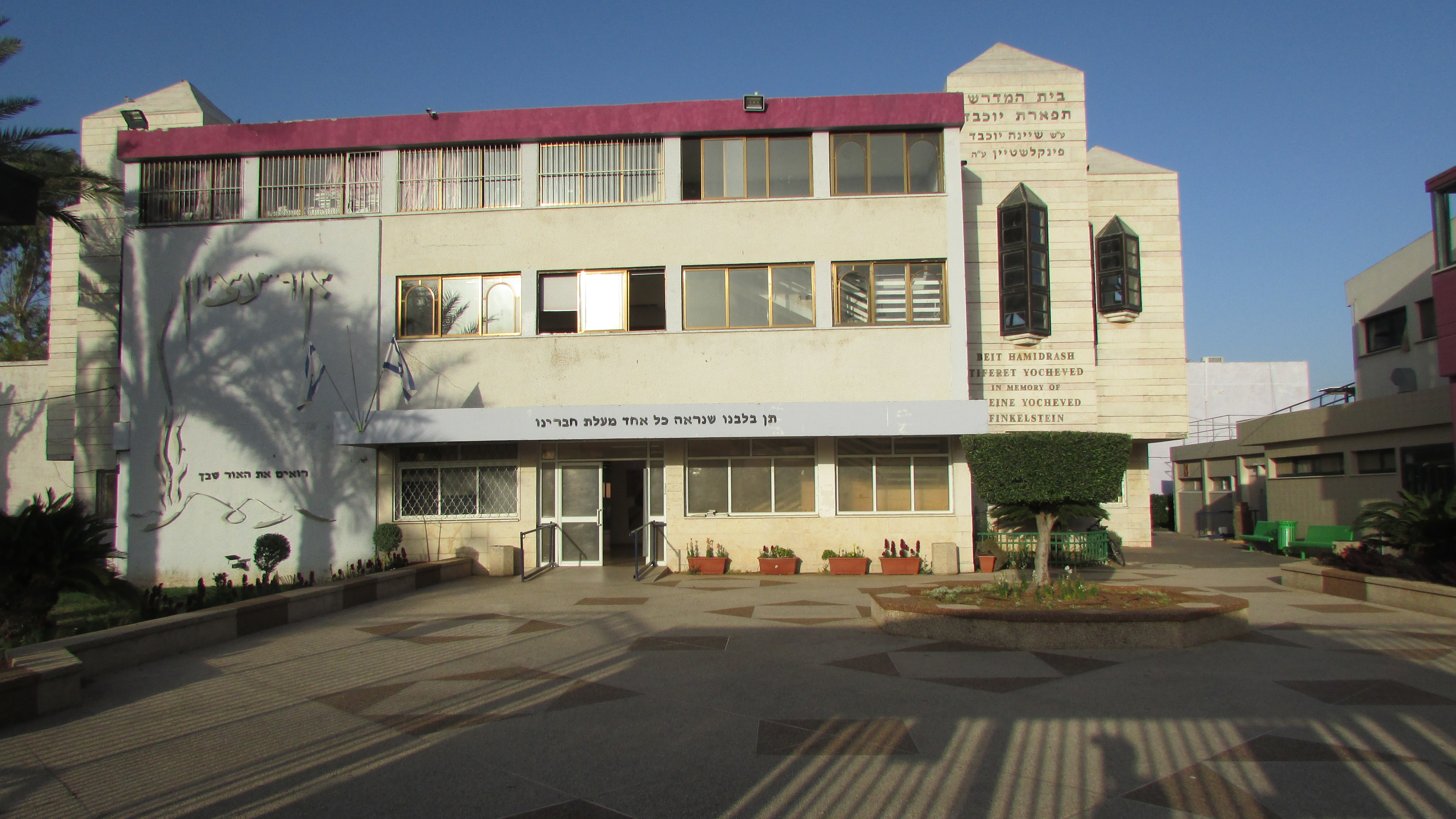
Or Etzion Command Torah Military Boarding School Complex

As early as the late 1960s, the National Religious Party raised the issue of establishing a religious military boarding school. In the early 1980s, Rabbi Chaim Druckman responded to a request from the IDF and the Ministry of Defense to establish the Or Etzion Command Torah Military Boarding School at the Yeshiva "Or Etzion", where he served as Rosh Yeshiva (dean). The boarding school was established by Lt. Col. Pinchas Naaman as a religious military boarding school in Merkaz Shapira. Pinchas also served as the boarding school's first commander. In 2019, the boarding school moved to operate under the Ministry of Defense, and its commander is Lt. Col. (res.) Doron Hillel, a graduate of the boarding school.

=== Curriculum and training track ===
In the training track, the trainees of the Yeshiva Military Boarding School for Command train and undergo content from the field of physical fitness, field patrol content and navigation. As part of the theoretical studies, the trainees will study a military major and will be tested in the field, as part of the study units required for the matriculation exam. The military boarding school students study sacred and secular studies within the framework of the "Or Etzion" high school yeshiva. In addition, the studies include a full matriculation exam.

The trainees study in a unique major, the "military major" - in which they learn the main foundations of military command and leadership, the battles of the Land of Israel and military history. As enrichment, the trainees undergo several physical fitness training sessions during the week, as well as holding debate workshops, a diving course, and a first-aid course.

=== Commanders ===
Commander's Name	Beginning of Term	End of Term
Pinchas Neeman	1980	1998
Nati Schechter	1998	2001
Edi Dagan	2001	2010
Eylon Heyman	2010	2016
Lior Perry	2016	2018
Doron Hallel	2019	

== Tel Aviv Command Military Academy (closed) ==
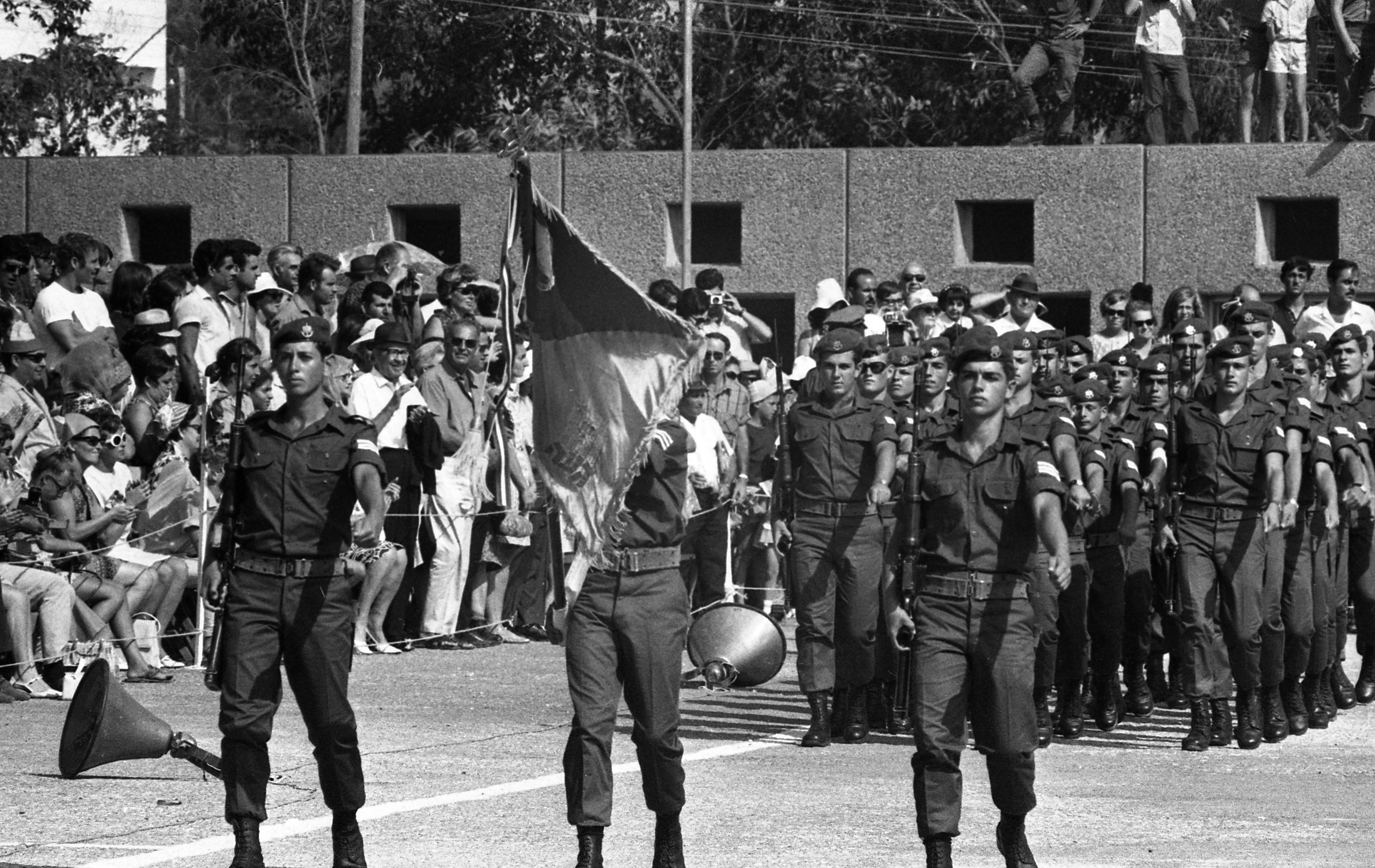
Graduation parade of the first year, 1969

First-year students of the Tel Aviv Military Academy, 1966

In 1965, a military boarding school was established next to the Herzliya Hebrew Gymnasium in Tel Aviv, which operated until 1984. It was headed by Lt. Col. Baruch Levy. This boarding school was also an educational institution that trained and prepared young men to become commanders in field units in the IDF. The graduates of the boarding school were intended for positions as company commanders in the IDF field units and committed to a permanent service of at least 3 years, even before their official conscription into the army. About 800 candidates registered for the first class, which was accepted in 1965, and 80 were accepted. Only 29 graduates graduated from the class. The vast majority of dropouts were due to insufficient success in secondary school studies and failure to advance to the higher class. In the classes that followed, the situation improved. Prime Minister Golda Meir attended the graduation ceremony of the first class in July 1969. Many journalists came to this event thinking that the Prime Minister would deliver a political statement in the midst of the War of Attrition with Egypt in Sinai. In the end, she did not do so, and only wished the graduates "good health." In the Yom Kippur War, 6 graduates of the class (21% of the graduates) were killed, all of whom, like most of the graduates of the class, were part of the company commanders' ranks in the Armored Forces and the Infantry and Paratroopers. The military boarding school next to the Herzliya Hebrew Gymnasium in Tel Aviv was closed in 1984 due to a decrease in the potential of those enrolled in the military boarding schools for command. Its graduates include David Barnea, Gabi Ashkenazi, Yoav Kutner, Ron Arad, Gal Hirsch and Eyal Zamir.

=== Commanders ===
Commander Name	Start of Term	End of Term
Baruch Levy	1964	1968
Amos Gilboa	1968	1972
Shai Raz	1973	1977
David Raz	1977	1980
Ephraim Almog Eizenfeld	1980	1984

== "Quietly and Safely" Association ==
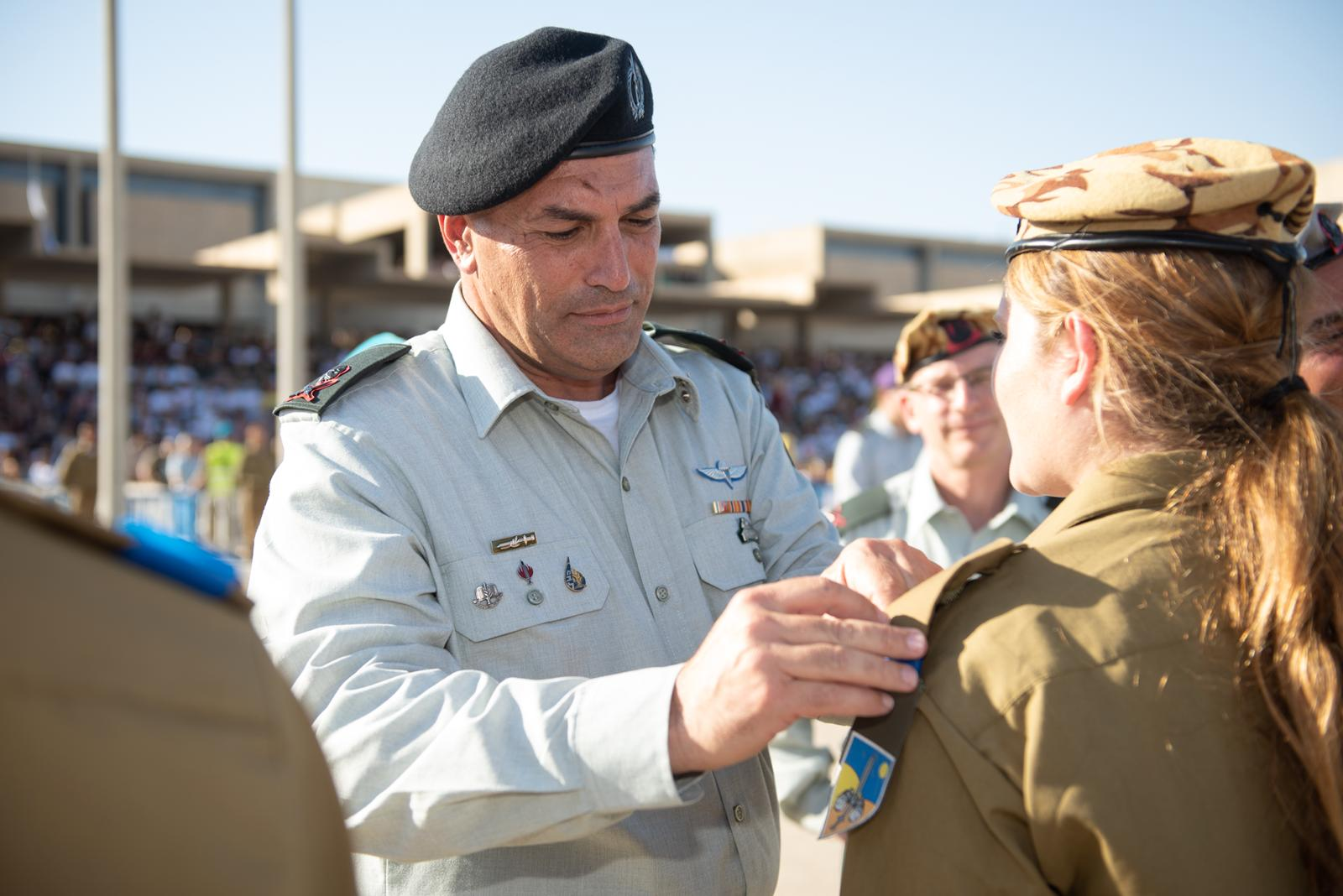
Major General Eyal Zamir, Deputy Chief of the General Staff, at the graduation ceremony of the Officers Course. On the left side of his left pocket is the Military Boarding School graduate pin

"Quietly and Safely" is an association established in 2000 by graduates of military boarding schools in Haifa and Tel Aviv. Its goals are to preserve the military boarding schools, provide them with a supportive environment, commemorate their graduates who fell in Israeli wars, and assist the boarding school's students and graduates during their military service in the IDF, and in their civilian lives in various areas. The name of the association is borrowed from the motto of the military boarding school that appears on its emblem. The association's members are graduates of the military boarding schools in Haifa and Tel Aviv, and a significant number of friends of the association.

The association is managed by the association's CEO, Yaniv Reznik, who reports to the association's board, headed by Maj. Gen. (ret.) Avi Mizrahi. Alongside him operates an advisory council whose members, as of 2014, include Gabi Ashkenazi, Doron Almog, Herzl Budinger, Yossi Ben-Hanan, Matan Vilnai, Gyora Rom, and Amram Mitzna.

Each year, the association selects a graduate who, during his military service and in his civilian life, embodies the goals and values of the boarding school in a way that sets an example for others. This graduate is awarded the "Exemplary Graduate" award at the association's annual conference.

== See also ==
- Junior Reserve Officers' Training Corps
