= Emanuel Sakel =

Israeli general (born 1940)

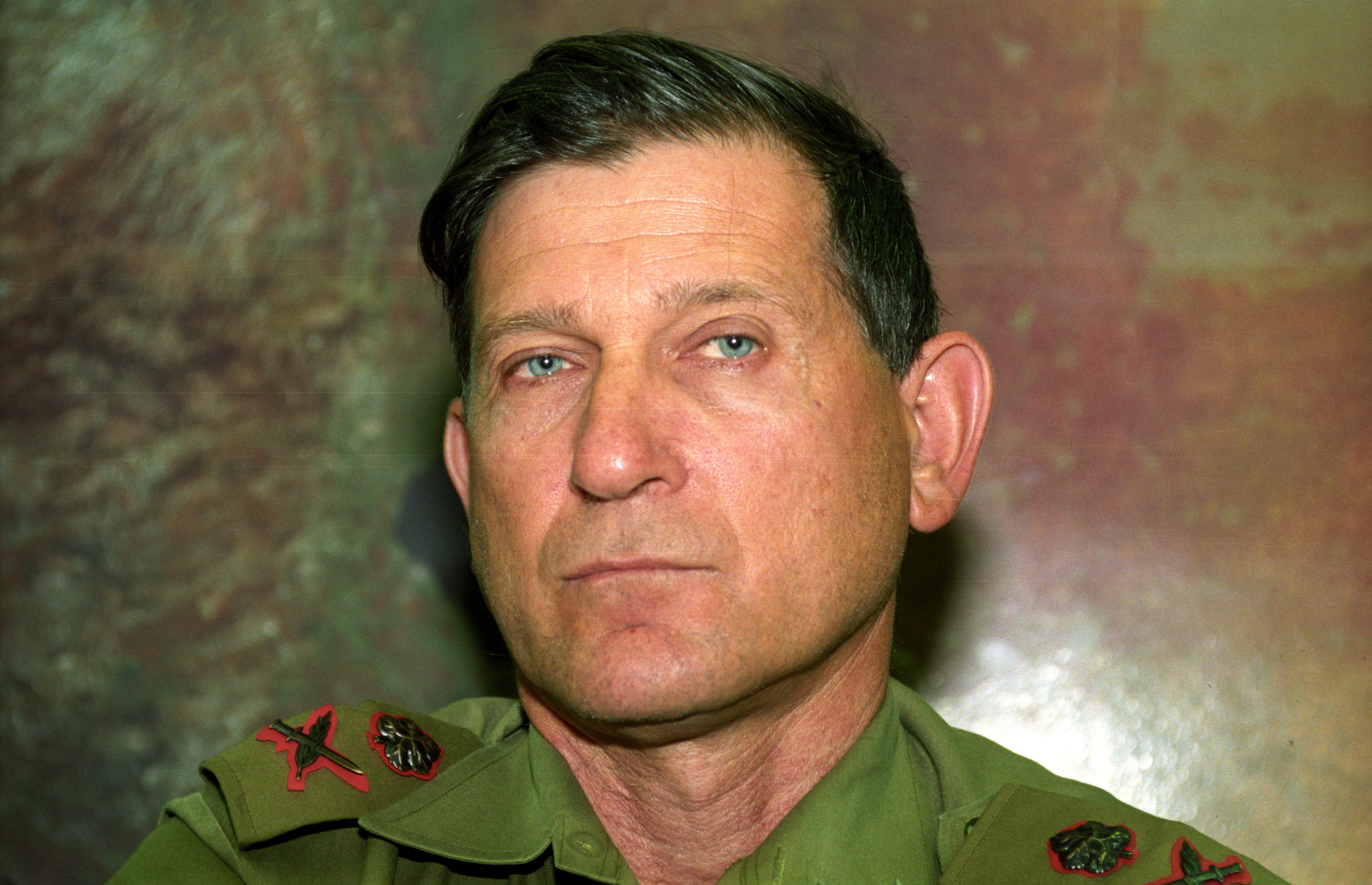
- Native name: עמנואל סקל
- Born: 10 August 1940 (age 85); Beit Yosef, Land of Israel
- Allegiance: Israel Defense Forces
- Service years: 1958–1994
- Rank: Aluf
- Commands: Commander of the 52 Battalion, Commander of the 252 Sinai Brigade, Commander GOC Army Headquarters
- Conflicts: Six-Day War; War of Attrition; Yom Kippur War; 1982 Lebanon War; First Intifada
- Awards: Medal of Courage
- Other work: Director of the Trans-Israel pipeline

Emanuel Sakel (Hebrew: עמנואל סקל; born 1940) is a retired Israeli general who held several prominent posts including command of the 252 Sinai Brigade, and the IDF GOC Army Headquarters. For his actions in the Yom Kippur War he received the Medal of Courage. After his military career, he became the CEO of the Trans-Israel pipeline.

== Biography ==
Emanuel Sakel was born in Beit Yosef. In 1958, he enlisted in the IDF and joined the Golani Brigade in which he served until the end of his service in 1961 at the rank of Second Lieutenant. Sakel studied Geology in the Hebrew University of Jerusalem and finished his studies in 1967. In 2010, he received his doctorate in political science from Bar-Ilan University.

Sakel resides in Rehovot and is married to Edna. He is the father of three. His eldest son, Yoav, served in the Sayeret of the Golani Brigade and was killed in 1986 during an operation in Southern Lebanon.

== Military career ==
In the Six-Day War, he was called in from reserves and he fought as the Commander of Sayeret's 4th Brigade. In 1968, he returned to the military and received the rank of Captain. He joined the Armored Corps and served in the 7th Armored Brigade as commander of Unit 82. In 1972 Sakel became the Commander of the 52 Battalion. In 1973, on the eve of the Yom Kippur War, Sakel and his battalion were stationed near the Bar Lev Line near Ras Sudar.

With the war's outbreak, Sakel's forces joined the 401st Brigade in fighting the invading Egyptian army. In the fighting Sakel's forces suffered heavy losses and his forces defended the Southern part of the Great Bitter Lake. Sakel's forces destroyed an entire Egyptian battalion, and during the course of the war Sakel's forces helped out an ambushed Israeli battalion in Mitla Pass. For his actions in the war, Sakel earned the Medal of Courage.

Later in his military career, Sakel commanded the 401st Brigade, and the 252 Sinai Brigade (a position he held during the 1982 Lebanon War). In the late 1980s, Sakel resigned from the IDF. In 1990, under the request of then Chief of General Staff, Ehud Barak, Sakel returned to the IDF and held the position of Commander GOC Army Headquarters until his resignation in 1994.

== Business career ==
In 1995, Sakel became the CEO of Trans-Israel pipeline, a position he held until 2005.

== Published works ==
- Soldier in the Sinai: A General's Account of the Yom Kippur War
