= Sagiv Dahan =

Israeli military officer

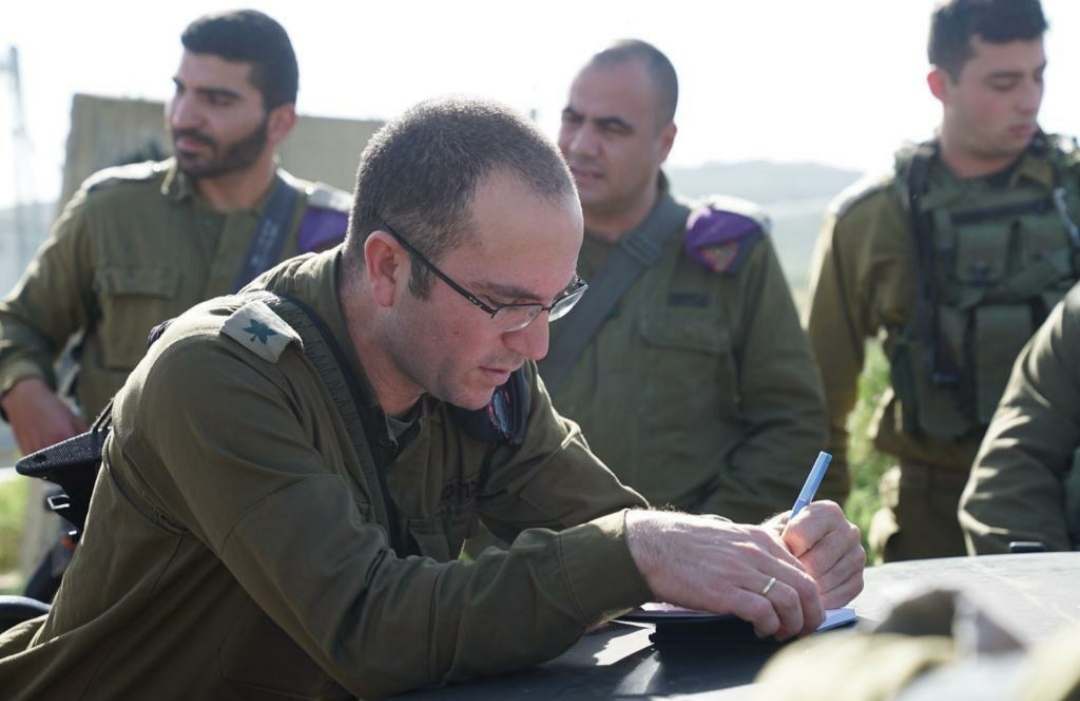
- Dahan, 2020
- Born: 1980 (age 45–46)
- Military career
- Allegiance: Israel
- Branch: Israel Defense Forces
- Service years: 1998–present
- Rank: Brigadier General
- Unit: 162nd Division
- Commands: 162nd Division 460th Brigade; Samaria Brigade 52nd Battalion
- Conflicts: South Lebanon conflict (1985–2000) Second Intifada; Operation Defensive Shield; 2006 Lebanon War; Operation Cast Lead; Operation Pillar of Defense; Operation Protective Edge; Operation Guardian of the Walls Iron Swords War
- Awards: Aluf Commendation

Sagiv Dahan (born 1980) is an Israeli military officer who serves as the commander of the 162nd Division of the Israel Defense Forces (IDF). Previously, he served as Chief of Staff of the Northern Command with the rank of brigadier general, as well as commander of the 460th Armored Training Brigade and the Samaria Brigade.

== Military career ==
Dahan enlisted in the IDF in 1998 and completed the Armored Corps tank commanders and officers courses. He served as a platoon commander and later as commander of "Pluga B" in the 52nd Battalion. He led the unit during Operation Cast Lead, during which he was wounded. Afterward, he served as deputy commander of the 9th Battalion.

In June 2014, Dahan was promoted to the rank of lieutenant colonel and appointed commander of the 52nd Battalion, leading it among other engagements during Operation Protective Edge. For its performance in the operation, the battalion received the Aluf Commendation. In 2016, he was appointed operations officer of the Judea and Samaria Division.

In July 2018, Dahan was appointed commander of the Samaria Brigade, a position he held until 2020.

In July 2021, he was appointed commander of the 460th Armored Training Brigade, a role he completed in May 2023.

On 1 May 2023, Dahan was promoted to brigadier general, and on 17 May 2023 assumed the position of Chief of Staff of the Northern Command. He served in this role during the Iron Swords War and Operation Northern Arrows.

In November 2024, IDF chief of staff Herzi Halevi announced that Dahan would replace Itzik Cohen as commander of the 162nd Division.

On 6 April 2025, he officially assumed command of the division.

== Personal life ==
Dahan is married and the father of three daughters. He is a graduate of the IDF Tactical Command College, holds an MBA from Ben-Gurion University of the Negev, and a second master's degree from the National Defense University in the United States.

Following complications during the birth of his daughter, which required multiple blood transfusions for his wife, Dahan initiated a large-scale blood donation drive together with the Shomron Regional Council. The event took place on 6 October 2019 at the Samaria Brigade base and aimed to break the Israeli record for blood donations in a single day. The drive set a new national record with 1,551 units of blood donated.
