= Guy Tzur =

Former major general of Israel

- גיא צור
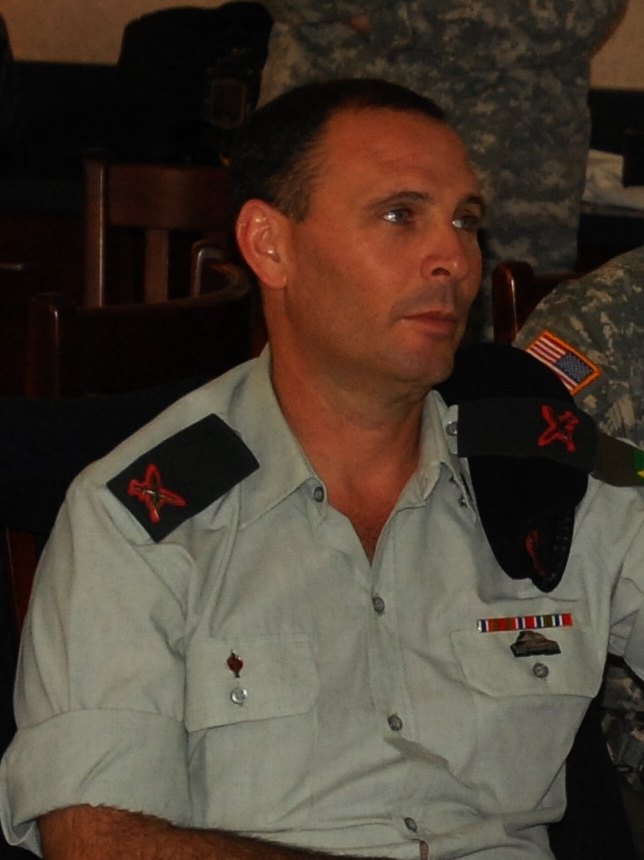
- Born: Givatayim
- Military career
- Allegiance: Israel
- Branch: Israel Defense Forces
- Rank: Aluf (Major general)
- Unit: Ground Forces Command

Guy Tzur (Hebrew: גיא צור; born 1962) was major general of the Ground Forces Command of the Israel Defense Forces.

== Biography ==
Guy Tzur was born in Givatayim. In the First Lebanon War in 1982, Tzur served as a platoon commander and deputy company commander of an armoured battalion. In the Second Lebanon War in 2006, he served as commander of Division 162, an active-duty formation.
