= Commander of the Israeli Ground Forces =

Highest ranking officer of the Israeli Ground Forces

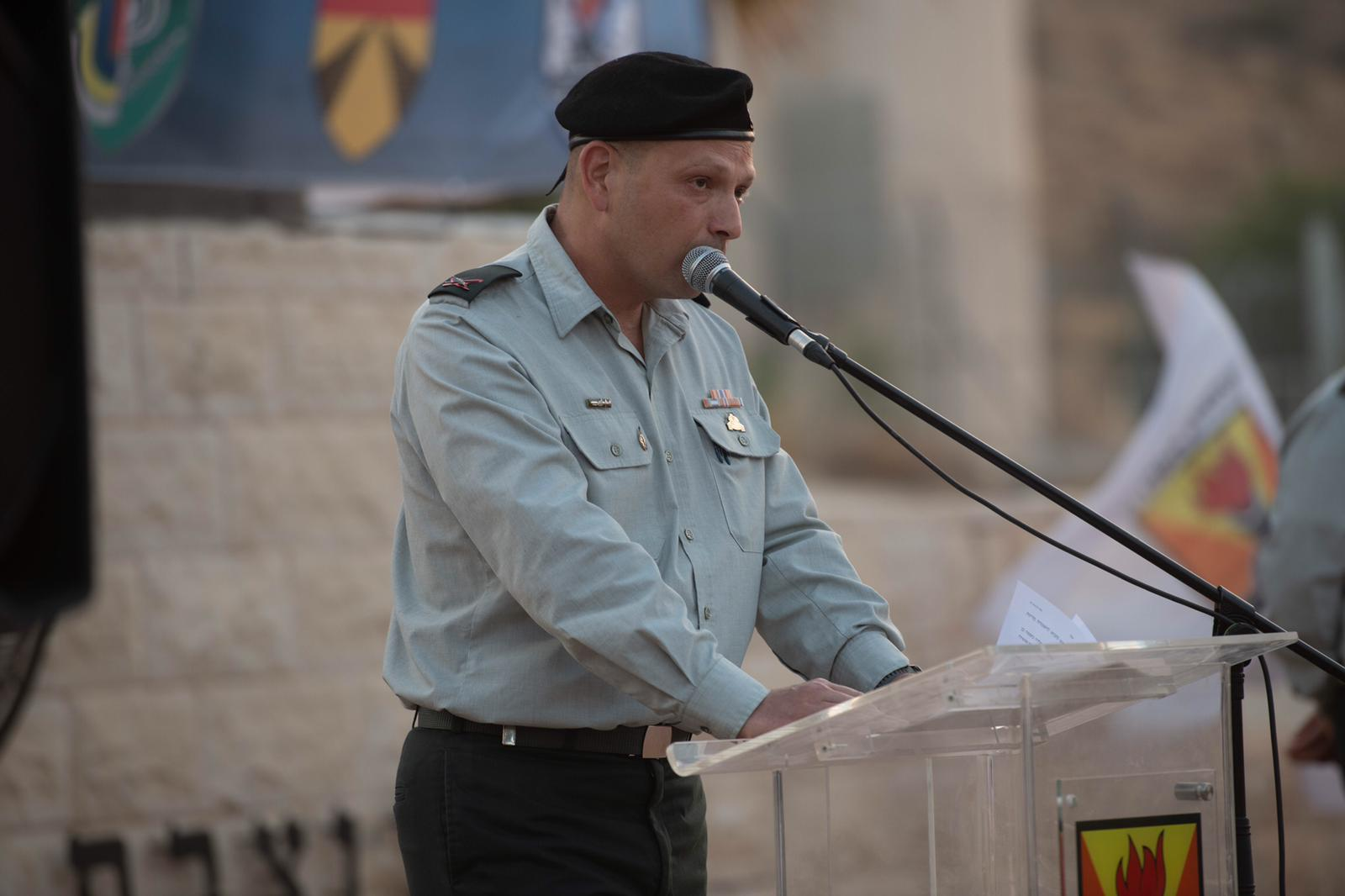
- Incumbent; Major General Nadav Lotan since November 2024
- Israeli Ground Forces
- Member of: General Staff of the IDF
- Reports to: Chief of the General Staff
- Appointer: Chief of the General Staff
- Formation: 1983
- First holder: Dan Shomron
- Website: www.idf.il/en/minisites/general-staff/

The Commander of the Israeli Ground Forces is the head and highest-ranking officer of Israeli Ground Forces, and is responsible for overall operations of the ground forces. The current Commander is Nadav Lotan.

== Headquarters ==
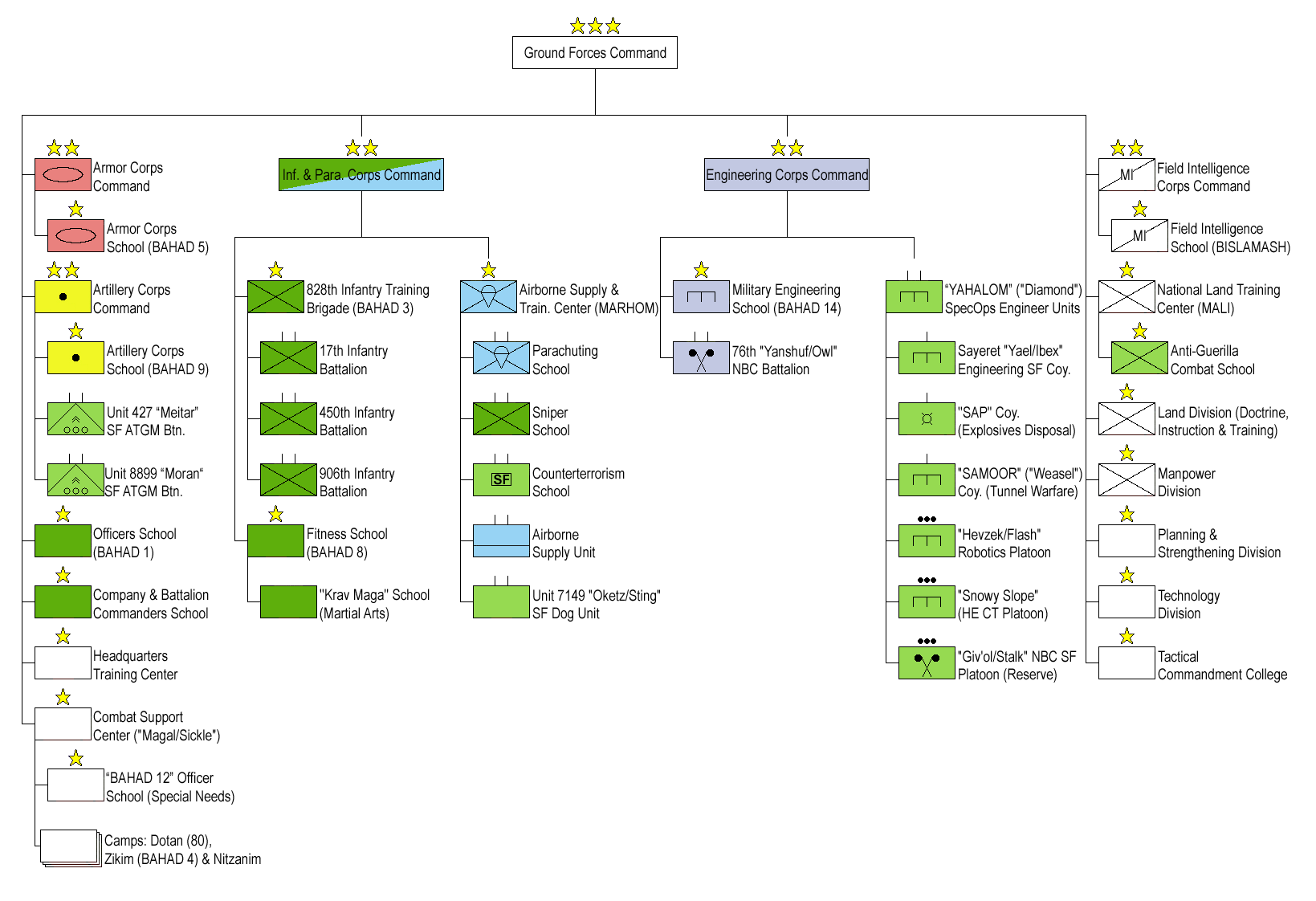
The structure of the ground forces

The Headquarters of the Ground Forces command the following corps:

- Infantry Corps (חיל הרגלים)
- Armor Corps (חיל השריון)
- Israeli Combat Engineering Corps (חיל ההנדסה הקרבית)
- Artillery Corps (חיל התותחנים)
- Combat Intelligence Collection Corps (חיל האיסוף הקרבי)

In addition, the Headquarters includes four staff divisions:

- Planning Division (Budget and Organization Planning) (חטיבת התכנון)
- Ground Division (Training and Doctrine) (חטיבת יבשה)
- Personnel Division (חטיבת כוח-אדם)
- Technological Division (Materiel R&D and Acquisition) (חטיבת הטכנולוגיה)

== List of officeholders ==
No.	Picture	Name	Took office	Left office	Time in office	Ref.
1	Dan Shomron	Aluf; Dan Shomron (1937–2008)	September 1983	January 1985	1 year, 4 months	–
2	Amir Drori	Aluf; Amir Drori (1937–2005)	January 1985	August 1986	1 year, 8 months	–
3	Uri Sagi	Aluf; Uri Sagi (born 1943)	August 1986	March 1991	4 years, 6 months	–
4	Emanuel Sakel	Aluf; Emanuel Sakel (born 1940)	March 1991	August 1994	3 years, 6 months	–
5	Zeev Livne [he]	Aluf; Zeev Livne (1945–2013)	August 1994	June 1996	1 year, 9 months	
6	Amos Malka [he]	Aluf; Amos Malka (born 1953)	June 1996	July 1998	2 years, 1 month	–
7	Moshe Soknik [he]	Aluf; Moshe Soknik (born 1949)	July 1998	June 2001	1 year, 11 months	–
8	Yiftah Ron-Tal	Aluf; Yiftah Ron-Tal (born 1956)	June 2001	November 2005	5 years, 5 months	–
9	Benny Gantz	Aluf; Benny Gantz (born 1959)	November 2005	20 December 2007	2 years, 1 month	–
10	Avi Mizrahi	Aluf; Avi Mizrahi (born 1957)	20 December 2007	September 2009	1 year, 8 months	–
11	Sami Turgeman	Aluf; Sami Turgeman (born 1964)	September 2009	February 2013	3 years, 5 months	
12	Guy Tzur	Aluf; Guy Tzur (born 1962)	February 2013	August 2016	3 years, 6 months	–
13	Kobi Barak [he]	Aluf; Kobi Barak (born 1964)	August 2016	May 2019	2 years, 9 months	–
14	Yoel Strick	Aluf; Yoel Strick (born 1966)	May 2019	October 2022	3 years, 5 months	–
15	Tamir Yadai	Aluf; Tamir Yadai (born 1969)	October 2022	November 2024	2 years, 1 month	–
16	Nadav Lotan [he]	Aluf; Nadav Lotan (born 1973)	November 2024	Incumbent	1 year, 9 months	–

== See also ==
- Israeli Ground Forces equipment
- Commander of the Navy (Israel)
- Commander of the Israeli Air Force
