= Avi Mizrahi =

Israeli general (born 1957)

- אבי מזרחי
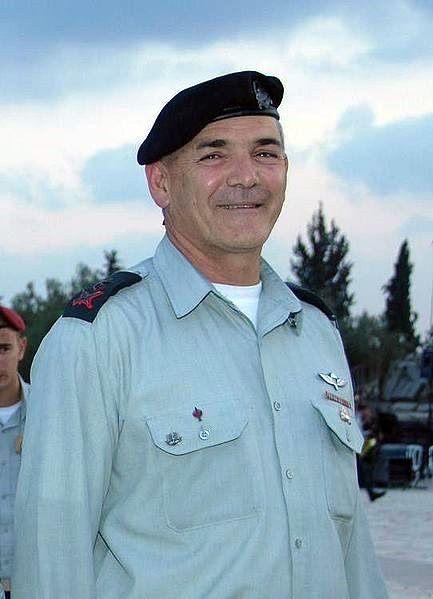
- Born: 1957 (age 68–69); Haifa, Israel
- Military career
- Allegiance: Israel
- Service years: 1975—2013
- Rank: Aluf
- Commands: Central Command

Aluf Avi (Abraham) Mizrahi (Hebrew: אבי מזרחי; born 1957) is an Israeli retired general who served as head of the Central Command of the Israel Defense Forces from October 2009 to March 2012.

== Military career ==
Mizrahi was drafted by the IDF in 1975, and joined Sayeret Golani (95th Recon. Company), the SF unit of the 1st Infantry Brigade. He later entered the Israeli Armor Corps, where he worked his way up to brigade commander. After that he served as the representative of the IDF GOC Army Headquarters at United States Army Training and Doctrine Command (TRADOC) and the commander of several formations.

In 2005 Mizrahi was appointed the head of the Logistics, Medical, and the Centers Directorate, and from 2007 until 2009 he served as the Chief of the Ground forces. Before his most recent appointment, Mizrahi served as the head of the IDF GOC Army Headquarters.

From October 2009 until March 2012 Mizrahi served as the head of the IDF Central Command.

== Turkish-Israeli diplomatic incident ==
In February 2009, during a speech at the Gelilot military base, Mizrahi caused a diplomatic incident, commenting on sharp critical remarks voiced by Turkish Prime Minister Recep Tayyip Erdogan over the Gaza War. Mizrahi noted that Turkey had no right to criticize Israel's action as Turkey itself stationed troops in Northern Cyprus, oppressed its Kurdish minority, and massacred Armenians during World War I. Israeli ambassador was summoned to Turkey's foreign ministry to explain these remarks, while IDF Spokesperson's Unit issued a statement saying Mizrahi's words did not represent any official position.
