= 500th Brigade =

Israeli military unit

- חטיבה 500
- Sleeve insignia
- Active: 1972 – 2003; 2026 –
- Country: Israel
- Branch: Israeli Ground Forces
- Type: Mechanized Infantry
- Role: Armoured warfare
- Size: Brigade
- Engagements: Yom Kippur War; 1982 Lebanon War

Commanders
- Notable commanders: Colonel Aryeh Keren

The Israeli Armor Corps 500 Brigade, also known as the Kfir (Young Lion) Formation, is a regular-service armoured tank brigade that existed from 1972 to 2003 and was reactivated in 2026. It was originally composed of three battalions: the Romach (429), Se'ara (430), and Gur (433) battalions. During the Yom Kippur War, it fought in the battle over the city of Suez under the 162nd Division, and was led by Colonel Aryeh Keren. Primarily relying on the Magach tank, it was situated in the Sinai border, until the beginning of the withdrawal following the Israel-Egypt Peace Treaty, when it was moved to the Jordan valley. During the 1982 Lebanon War, it fought in the central front (again under the 162nd Division), where it took part in the Siege of Beirut.
