= 401st Brigade (Israel) =

Unit of the Israel Defense Forces

- 401st Brigade insignia and shoulder tag
- Active: 1966–present
- Country: Israel
- Branch: Armored Corps
- Type: Armor
- Part of: Southern Command
- Engagements: War of Attrition; Yom Kippur War; 1982 Lebanon War; Second Intifada; 2006 Lebanon War; 2008 Gaza War; 2014 Gaza War; Gaza War

Commanders
- Current commander: Yoav Schneider

The 401st "Iron Tracks" Brigade (Hebrew: עקבות הברזל, Ikvot HaBarzel) is an Armored Brigade in the 162nd Division of the Israeli Defence Forces (IDF).

== History ==
Established in 1966, 401 Brigade is one of the youngest brigades of the IDF. It took its current form in 1985. The brigade was initially composed of the 46th and 195th Armored Battalions and the 52nd and 34th Infantry Battalions, which were converted to armor.

The 34th Battalion was disbanded and re-established in 1988 as an anti-tank battalion, later designated as the 94th "Duchifat" (Hebrew: דוכיפת, hoopoe) Mechanized Infantry Battalion. In 2002 it was returned to the brigade. In 2005 it was transferred to the Judea and Samaria Territorial Division.

=== War of Attrition ===
The brigade was formed by expanding and splitting the 14th Armored Brigade together with which they held the 160 kilometers long Suez Canal defensive line in Sinai. The brigade was the first to be equipped with American "Patton" M60 tanks.

=== Yom Kippur War ===
Along with the 188th Brigade on the Golan Heights the brigade suffered heavy losses in the early days of the war. The 195th Battalion אדם Adam belonged to the brigade in the war.

=== Seventies ===
The brigade was re-formed and returned to Sinai to continue much the same manner as it did before the war. It was included in the evacuation of Sinai under the Camp David peace agreement with Egypt, moving to the lower Jordan Valley. In 1981, the 195th Battalion was transferred to the 500th Armored Brigade. In 1982 the brigade received the 9th Battalion.

=== Operation "Peace for the Galilee"/ Lebanon War ===
In the war the brigade took part as a part of the Eastern Corps through the Lebanon ridge. One of the brigade's battalions took part in the Sultan Yaakub engagement, making it all the way to the Beirut-Damascus highway.

=== Eighties and Nineties ===
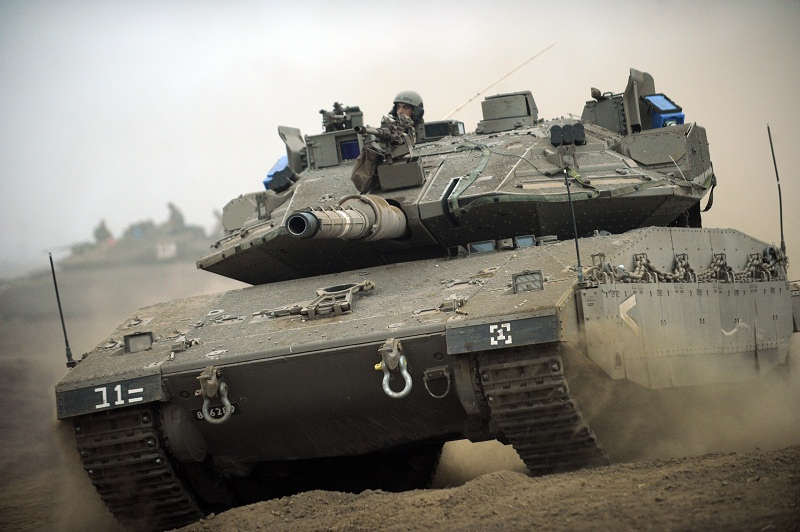
A tank during a training day held in the Golan Heights for the 401st Armored Brigade

The brigade alternated between varied infantry missions in the West Bank, mainly in the Jordan Valley, with tank missions in the Security Zone in south Lebanon.

=== 2nd Intifada ===
Since 2000 the brigade has been serving in the Israeli occupied territories, doing mostly infantry and police duty. It has been re-equipping with Israeli-made Merkava tanks to replace the Magach.

=== 2nd Lebanon war ===
In July 2006, when the 2006 Lebanon War broke, the 401st Brigade was among the first units to travel up north into battle. The brigade fought mostly in the Eastern zone, by the villages of Markabeh, Bint Jbeil and the Salooky Valley. The 401st Brigade lost 12 soldiers in battle, with four killed after their Puma armored engineering vehicle was struck. Dozens were injured.

=== Operation Cast Lead ===
In 2009, the brigade played a vital role in the Operation Cast Lead. The brigade entered the Gaza Strip through the Netzarim Corridor and kept up its advance until it had reached the coast, effectively cutting the strip in half.

After the operation, the brigade resumed training.

=== Operation Protective Edge ===
The Merkava Mk. IVm tanks of 401st Brigade (IDF) killed between 120 and 130 Hamas militants during the ground fighting phase of Operation Protective Edge.

=== Gaza war ===
The 52nd Battalion of the 401st Brigade was involved in combat near Zikim on 10 October 2023, according to a video posted on social media by the IDF. Commander Ehsan Daxa was killed in action during the siege of Jabalia. Meir Biderman was appointed as the commander of the unit. On 7 June 2026, Yoav Schneider was appointed commander of the unit after Biderman was seriously injured in a Hezbollah drone attack on 20 May.

== Brigade organization ==
- 401st Armored Brigade "Iron Trails"
  - 9th Armored Battalion "Eshet" (Merkava Mk.4M)
  - 46th Armored Battalion "Shelah" (Merkava Mk.4M)
  - 52nd Armored Battalion "Ha-Bok'im/The Breachers" (Merkava Mk.4M)
  - 601st Combat Engineer Battalion "Asaf"
  - Logistics Battalion "Iron Trails"
  - 298th Signals Company "Eyal"
