= 460th Brigade (Israel) =

460th "Bneir Or" Brigade
- חטיבה 460
- Active: 1948–present
- Country: Israel
- Allegiance: Israel Defense Forces
- Branch: Armored Corps
- Type: Armor
- Part of: Southern Command
- Garrison/HQ: Camp Shizafon
- Engagements: Yom Kippur War; Operation Protective Edge; Gaza war

Commanders
- Current commander: Aluf mishne Dvir Edri

The Israeli 460th Armoured "Bnei Or" Brigade is the training formation subordinate to the 80th Division of the Southern Command located in Shizafon base.

== Selection and training ==
All recruits must have a minimum Medical Profile score of 72. Recruits initially complete eight weeks of basic training, which is classified as Rifleman 04 in the Tironut system. They are trained in light weaponry, field training, first aid, and physical fitness.

After completing basic training, the recruit spend six weeks training in one of three specialties: gunner, loader, or driver. During this time, they work on both theoretical and practical tasks. After finishing this training, the recruits receive their beret and proceed to 10 weeks of exercises in which they practice combat and tank crew operations.

At the end of the course, some soldiers are chosen to do the tank commander's course. The tank commander's course lasts approximately three and a half months. Candidates are trained in two additional specialties that they did not have prior training in, as well as the fundamentals of command, control, navigation, and situational evaluation. At the end of the school, exceptional soldiers are given the opportunity to attend the officer's course, which lasts seven months and teaches them how to command an armored platoon in close coordination with other field units.

After completing their active duty, Armored Corps members are transferred to reserve forces. Active reservists in the Armor Corps participate in annual training exercises.

== Brigade organization 2026 ==
- 460th Armored Brigade "Bnei Or" ("Sons of Light") (Armor School)
  - 195th Battalion "Magen" (Armor School) (Merkava Mk.4)
  - 196th Battalion "Shahak" (Armor Officers' Course) (Merkava Mk.4)
  - 198th Battalion "Azuz" (Advanced Training and NCO School) (Merkava Mk.4)
  - 532nd Battalion "Shelah" (Operational Training) (Merkava Mk.4)
  - Logistic Battalion (Reserve)
  - 460th Reconnaissance Company (Reserve)
  - Signal Company (Reserve)

== History ==
=== Operation Protective Edge (2014) ===
During the 2014 Gaza War, the 460th Brigade carried out ground operations in the Gaza Strip. The three southernmost Israeli troops in the Gaza Strip—the 84th Givati Brigade, the 35th Paratrooper Brigade, and the 460th Armored Brigade—were engaged in severe fighting. The 460th Armored Brigade had operated in Deir al-Balah.

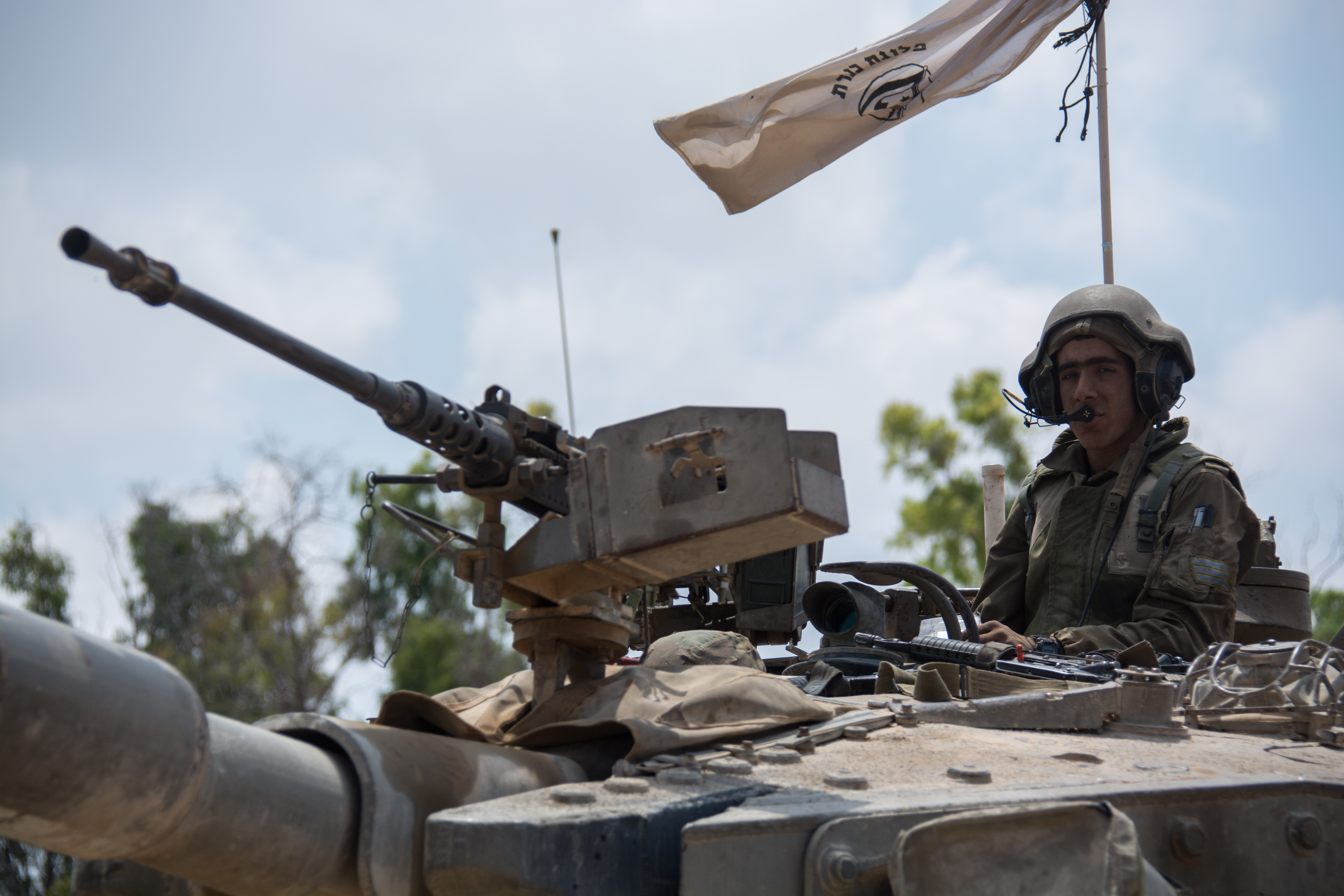
Armored Corps Operate Near the Gaza Border

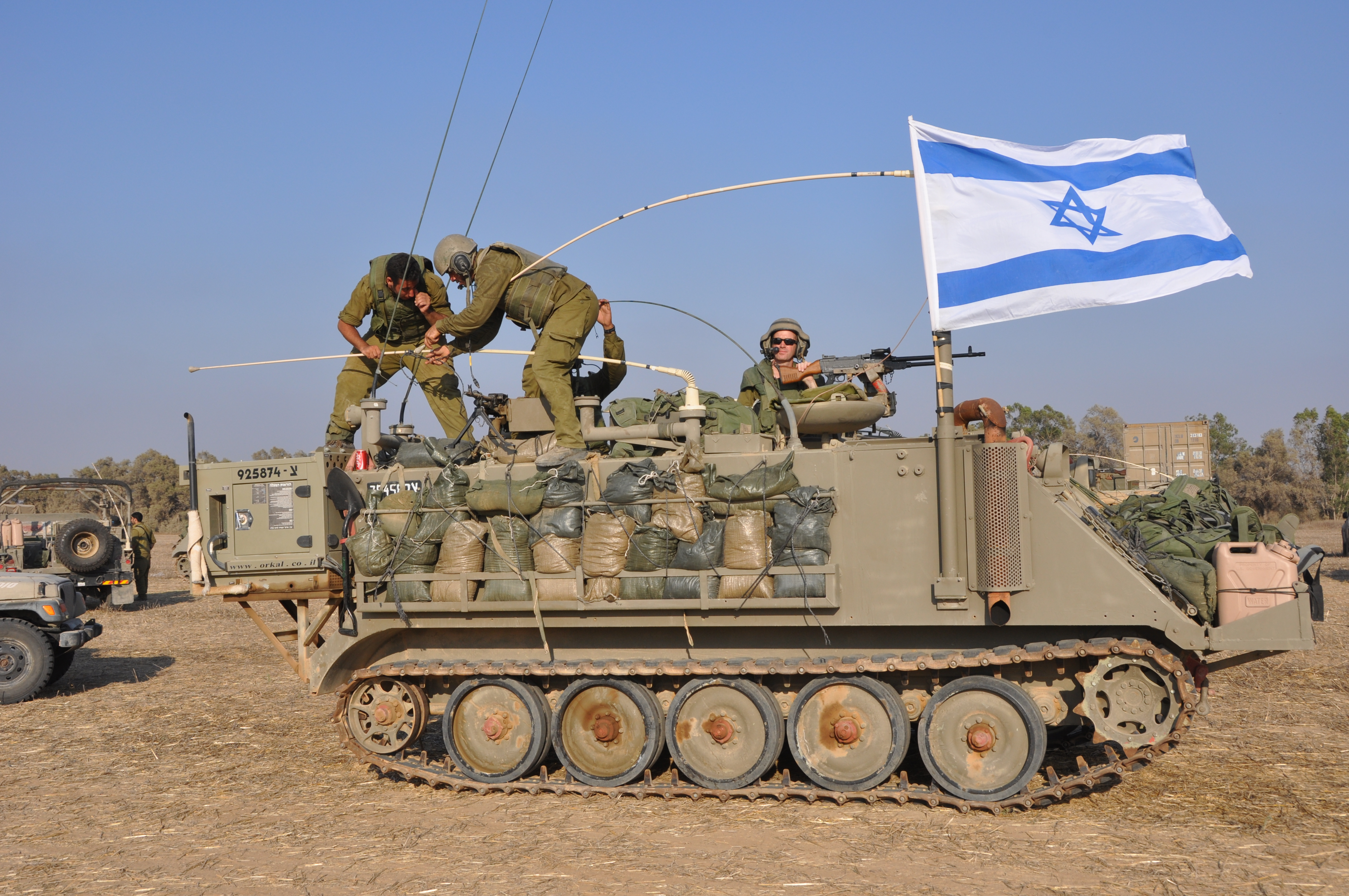
Armored vehicles from the 460th Brigade operating near the Gaza border

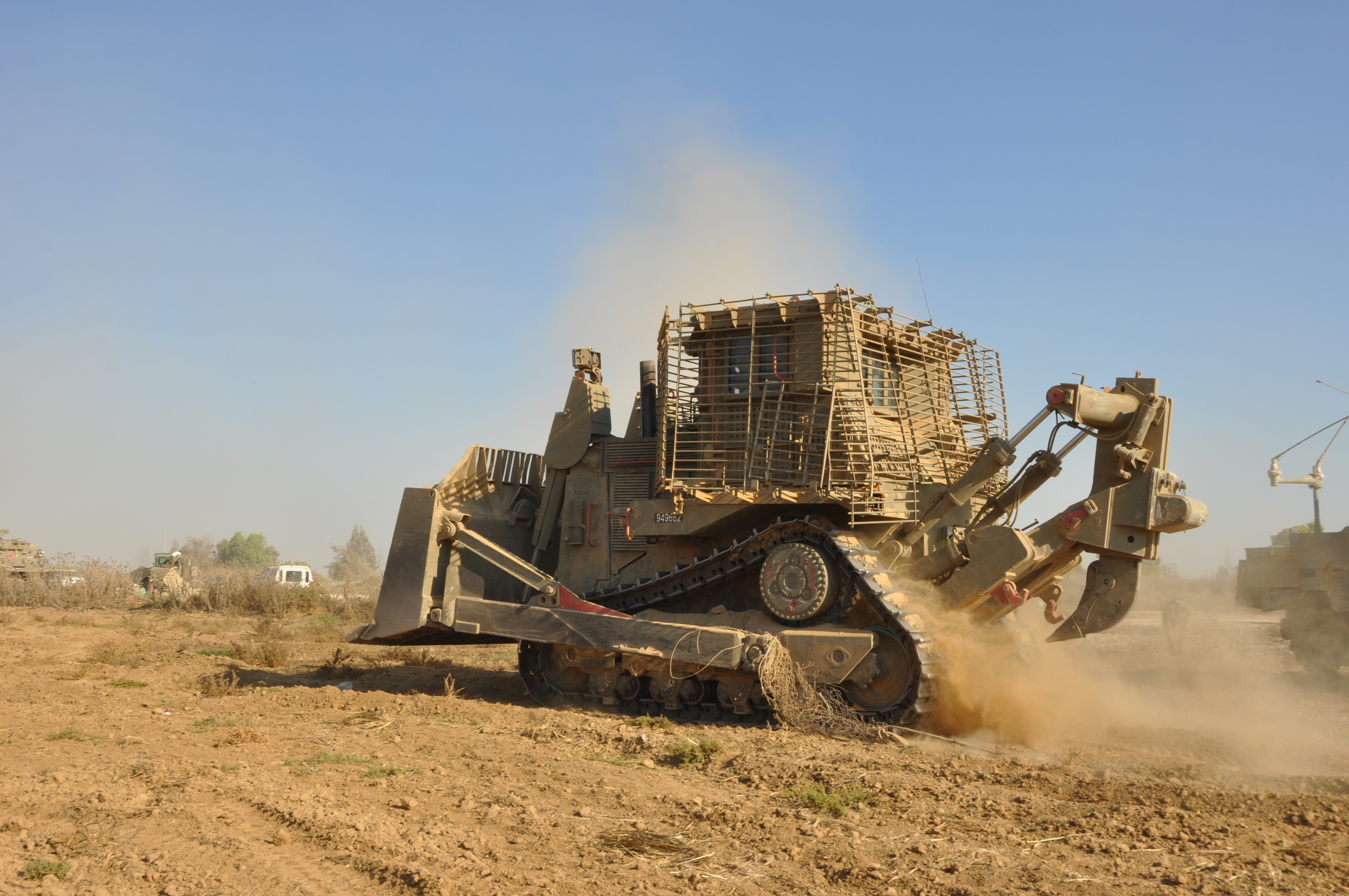
IDF Caterpillar D9 armored bulldozer during Operation Protective Edge

=== 2023 Israel–Gaza War ===
According to the Israel Defense Forces, 460th Brigade has operated in central combat zones in the Gaza Strip, including the Shati area, the "Security Quarter," Jabaliya and Daraj Tuffah.

IDF announced operations in daraj and Tuffah on 21 December 2023, it announced completion on 2 January 2024. During the 460th Brigade's efforts to discover and destroy subsurface infrastructure, tunnel shafts and Hamas command centers were demolished by combat engineers. The enemy's preparation for a long stay in the tunnels can be noticed based on the water and oxygen sources located inside. The 460th Brigade is one of the units being withdrawn to return to "scheduled training."

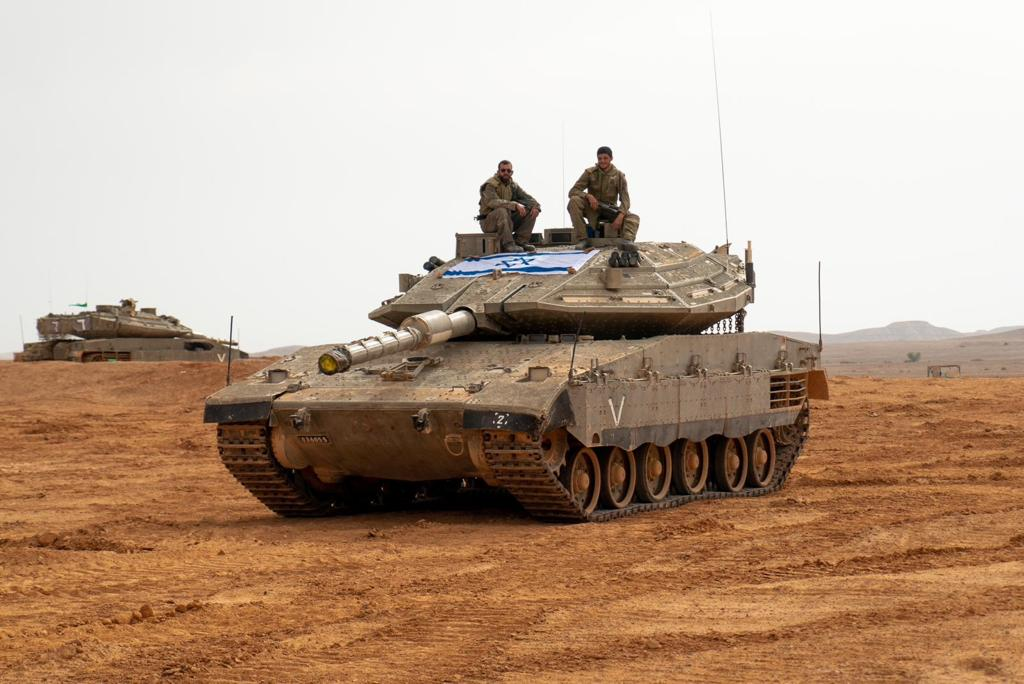
IDF ground forces 75th Independence day display

The unit saw operation later in Rafah offensive along with the 7th Armored Brigade (Israel).
