= Armored Corps (Israel) =

Corps of the Israel Defense Forces

- Armored Corps Insignia
- Active: 1948–present
- Country: Israel
- Allegiance: Israel Defense Forces
- Branch: Israeli Ground Forces
- Size: 2,200~ Main Battle Tanks. Approximately 1,760 of which are combat ready.
- Part of: Maneuvering corps GOC Army Headquarters
- Motto(s): "The man in the tank will win" (Hebrew: האדם שבטנק ינצח, Ha'adam she'Ba Tank Ye'na'tzeah)
- Equipment: The Merkava Main Battle tank
- Engagements: War of Independence; Sinai War; Six-Day War; War of Attrition; Yom Kippur War; First Lebanon War; First Intifada; Second Intifada; Second Lebanon War; Gaza War; Operation Protective Edge; Gaza war

Commanders
- Current commander: Hisham Ibrahim

Insignia
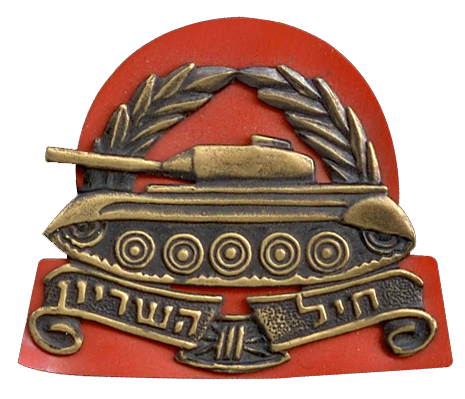
- Cap badge

- Flag

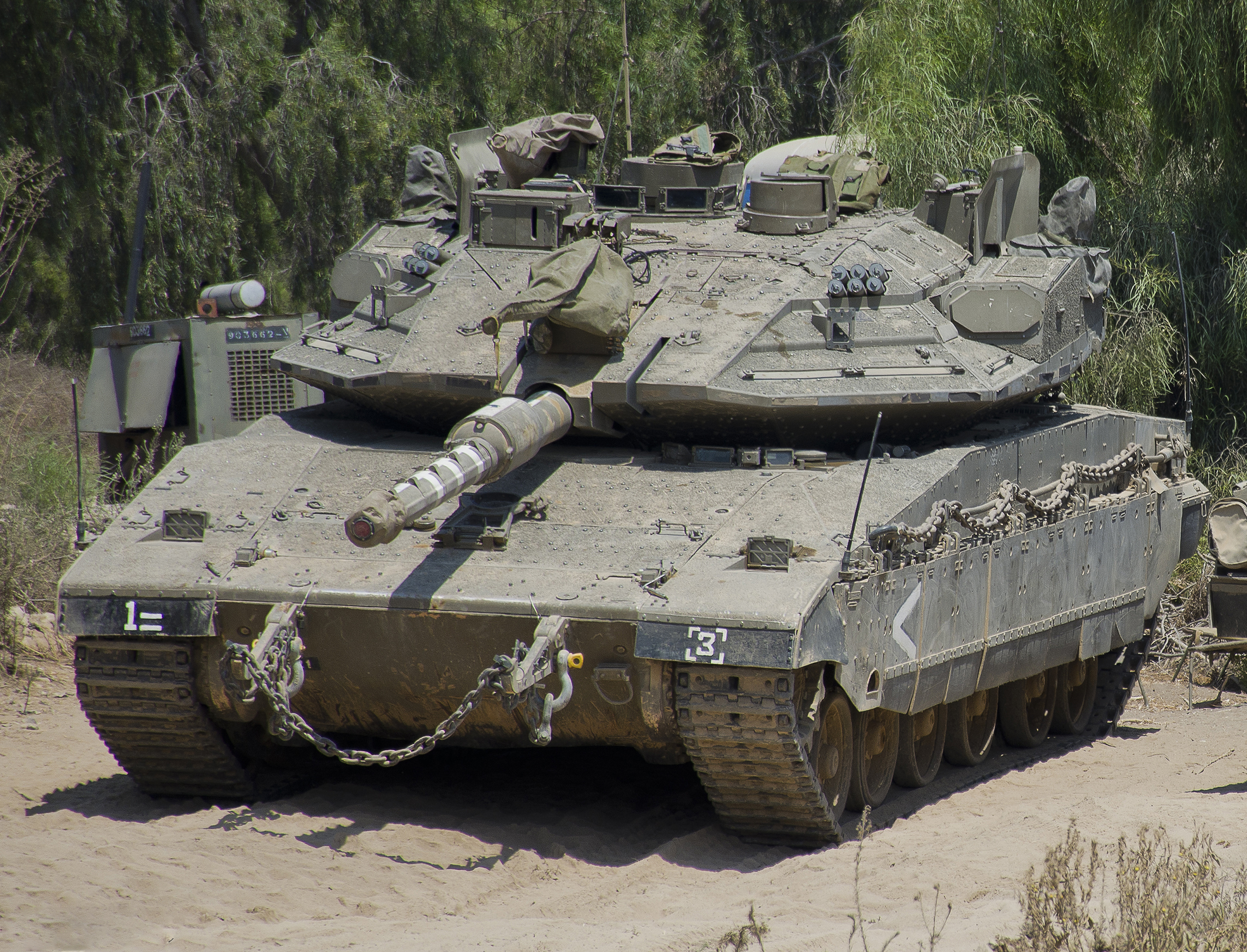
Merkava Mk 4M main battle tank

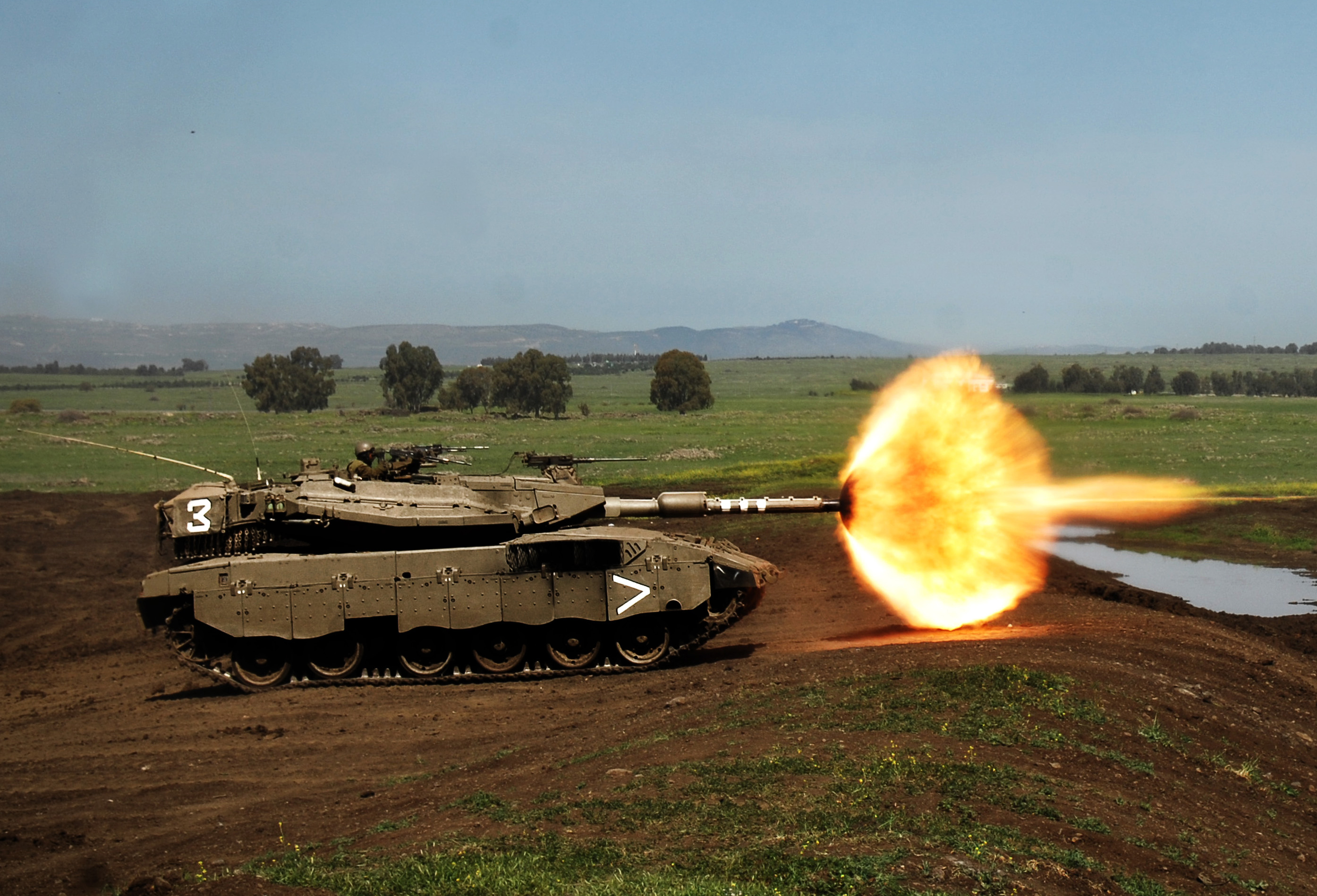
Merkava Mk 3D Baz tank fires

The Israeli Armored Corps (Hebrew: חֵיל הַשִּׁרְיוֹן, Heil HaShiryon) is a corps of the Israel Defense Forces that, since 1998, has been subordinate to GOC Army Headquarters. The Armored Corps is the principal maneuvering corps, and primarily bases its strength on main battle tanks.

The Armored Corps is the decisive corps in GOC Army Headquarters, and bases its power on a combination of mobility, armor, and firepower. During wars, its primary role is to lead the first line of the attacking forces and to clear the area of the enemy. Secondarily, it blocks the armor forces of the enemy and seeks to destroy its tanks and armor. During peacetime, it reinforces the Infantry Corps while it performs security tasks, with the tanks serving as mobile bunkers.

== Armored Corps' role ==
The Armored Corps are the decisive part of Israel's Ground Forces. The main elements it uses to make crucial blows are Mobility, Durability and Fire Power. The corps mostly operate Main battle tanks but also Mobile Infantry and Mobile Armor support.

In wars there are two objectives that the armored corps are designated to accomplish.

1. Lead the way for the infantry in the front line, and help clear the area of enemy troops.
2. Block the enemy's armored forces and destroy it.

In times of peace, the armored corps provide support for the infantry corps in the continuous-Security tasks such as prevention of underground activity or intelligence gathering. The Tanks are used as Mobile outposts for the infantry.

== Assembly ==
The Israeli Armored Corps were assembled during the War of Independence. The corps started from the Armored Service, the Palmach's armored unit, that was established on February 24, 1948. Yitzhak Sade was appointed as the head of the unit. On May 24, 1948, the first armored brigade of the IDF was announced, The 8th Brigade. The personnel were recruited from various places such as the British army and other allied countries' militaries, members of the Haganah, the Palmach, and other resistance movements.

The corps consisted of ten obsolete Hotchkiss tanks from France, two Cromwell tanks stolen from the British Army, and a single Sherman tank stolen from the British Army. Later in the war, additional Sherman tanks were purchased from Italy. Two of them participated in Operation Horev in December 1948.

== Active armored brigades ==
The following list contains the currently active armored brigades:

- 7th Armored Brigade "Saar me-Golan"
- 188th Armored Brigade "Barak"
- 401st Armored Brigade "I'kvot ha-Barzel"
- 460th Armored Brigade "Bnei Or" (Training)

=== Unit histories ===
- 36th Division "Ga'ash": the division is stationed on the Golan Heights under Northern Command.
  - 7th Armored Brigade "Saar me-Golan": the brigade was the first IDF armored brigade and has participated in all of Israel's wars. The brigade's fighting during the Suez War resulted in a breakthrough in how the army approached the character of armored warfare. As of 2014, the brigade is transitioning from Merkava 2 tanks to Merkava 4 tanks.
  - 188th Armored Brigade "Barak": beginning with the Six-Day War, the brigade participated in all of Israel's wars. During the Yom Kippur War, the brigade was the first line of defense in the first days of the war in the Southern Golan, and saw almost all of its officers killed in action. It was the last armored brigade to use the Centurion tank, converting to Merkava 3 tanks in 1992, later completing their conversion to Merkava Mark 4M-400 in July 2019.
- 162nd Division "Ha-Plada": the division is assigned to Southern Command.
  - 401st Armored Brigade "I'kvot ha-Barzel": the brigade was formed in 1968 in order to control the Suez Canal line. During the Yom Kippur War, it faced the first line of attack in the canal and suffered heavy losses. During the 1982 Lebanon War, it fought in the Southern force—one of its battalions participated in the Sultan Yaakov battle. During 2004–05, the brigade's Magach tanks were replaced by Merkava 4 tanks.
- 460th Armored Brigade "Bnei Or": the brigade is the training brigade of the Armored Corps. It maintains two bases: the Shizafon training base—the school for the corps' commanders, where the officers and tank commanders are instructed, as well as basic training for all brigades, and advanced training for the 401st and 7th brigades — and Camp Magen-Sayarim, which is shared with the Combat Intelligence Collection Corps and Border Defense Corp as grounds for the advanced training for soldiers of the 188th Brigade.

As an added footnote - Sayarim used to be the Armored Corp base for basic training for Armored Corpsmen. Advanced training was received in specific designated companies in active battalions under the operational brigades. Around 2004, advanced training was moved to Shizafon, whereafter basic training was also gradually moved to Shizafon. After the creation and later disbanding of in 2021 of the Mesaya'at fire support and reconnaissance training battalion and operational companies in active battalions, the advanced training of the 188th brigade was moved to Sayarim, where it remains, per 2022. Plans are discussed for the re-integration of the 188th advanced training to Shizafon, and of all advanced training returning to active battalions.

== Reserve armored brigades ==
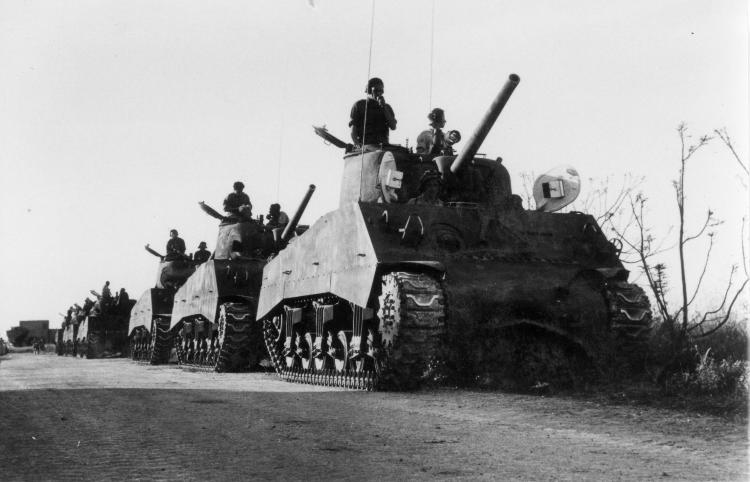
Sherman tanks of the Israeli forces in 1948

The following list contains the reserve armored brigades as of 2024:

- 4th Armored Brigade "Kiryati"
- 8th Armored Brigade "HaZaken"
- 10th Armored Brigade "Harel"
- 14th Armored Brigade "Machatz"
- 179th Armored Brigade "Re'em"
- 205th Armored Brigade "Egrof HaBarzel"
- 679th Armored Brigade "Yiftach"

=== Unit histories ===
- 252nd Division "Sinai", the division is assigned to Southern Command:
  - 10th Armored Brigade "Harel": the brigade was established as a division of the Palmach on 16 April 1948, immediately after Operation Nachshon. Yitzhak Rabin was appointed as its first commander. During the Suez Crisis (Kadesh Operation) in 1956, the brigade fought as an infantry brigade commanded by Shmuel Gudar. In 1959, the brigade was made into a reserve unit of the Armored Corps. In the Six-Day War, the brigade fought in the battles for Jerusalem under the command of Uri Ben Ari. Today, the brigade is part of Uzvat Amud ha-Esh ("Pillar of Fire").
  - 14th Armored Brigade "Machatz"': the brigade was active during the War of Attrition when it split to provide the basis for the 401st Armoured Brigade. During the Yom Kippur War, it was initially an armored reserve supporting the infantry brigades holding the Bar-Lev Line. It suffered terrible casualties during the war but was rebuilt afterwards.

== Selection and training ==
All recruits must have a minimum Medical Profile of 72. Cadets first undergo eight weeks of basic training, which is classed as Rifleman 04 level in the Tironut system. They train in light weapons, field training, first aid, and physical fitness.

Following the end of basic training, the cadets train for six weeks in one of three specialties: gunner, loader, and driver. They engage in theoretical and practical exercises during this period. After completing this training, the cadets are granted their beret and move on to complete 10 weeks of exercises, during which they practice engaging in combat and functioning as tank crews.

At the end of the course, some soldiers are selected to attend the tank commander's course. The tank commander's course lasts about three and a half months. Cadets train in the two other specialties that they did not train in earlier, and in the principles of command, control, navigation, and assessment of situations. At the end of the course, exceptional soldiers are offered the opportunity to attend the officer's course, which lasts 7 months, where they learn to command an armored platoon in close cooperation with other field units.

After Armored Corps soldiers complete their active service, they are moved into reserve units. Active reservists in the Armor Corps attend training exercises once a year.

== Disbanded units ==
- 211th Brigade

Also known as the Yishai (acronym for "Guardians of Jerusalem Unit"), during the Lebanon War of 1982, it was famously led by Colonel Eli Geva, who, during the Siege of Beirut, refused to lead his soldiers into the city for moral reasons. He was dismissed from the army. The brigade was dissolved in the early 1990s.

- 500th Brigade

Also known as the Kfir ("Young Lion") Formation, this was a regular armor brigade that operated from 1972 until 2003. During the Yom Kippur War, it participated in the Battle of Suez. During the Lebanon War of 1982, it fought in the framework of the Eastern force and participated in the Eyn Zhalata battle. In 2003, due to changes in the IDF structure, and the lessening of the threat from the eastern front, due to the US war in Iraq, the brigade was dissolved.

== See also ==
- Yad La-Shiryon
