= Jinba =

Village in Hebron Governorate, Palestine

Jinba جنبا (Arabic)
- Village / hamlet
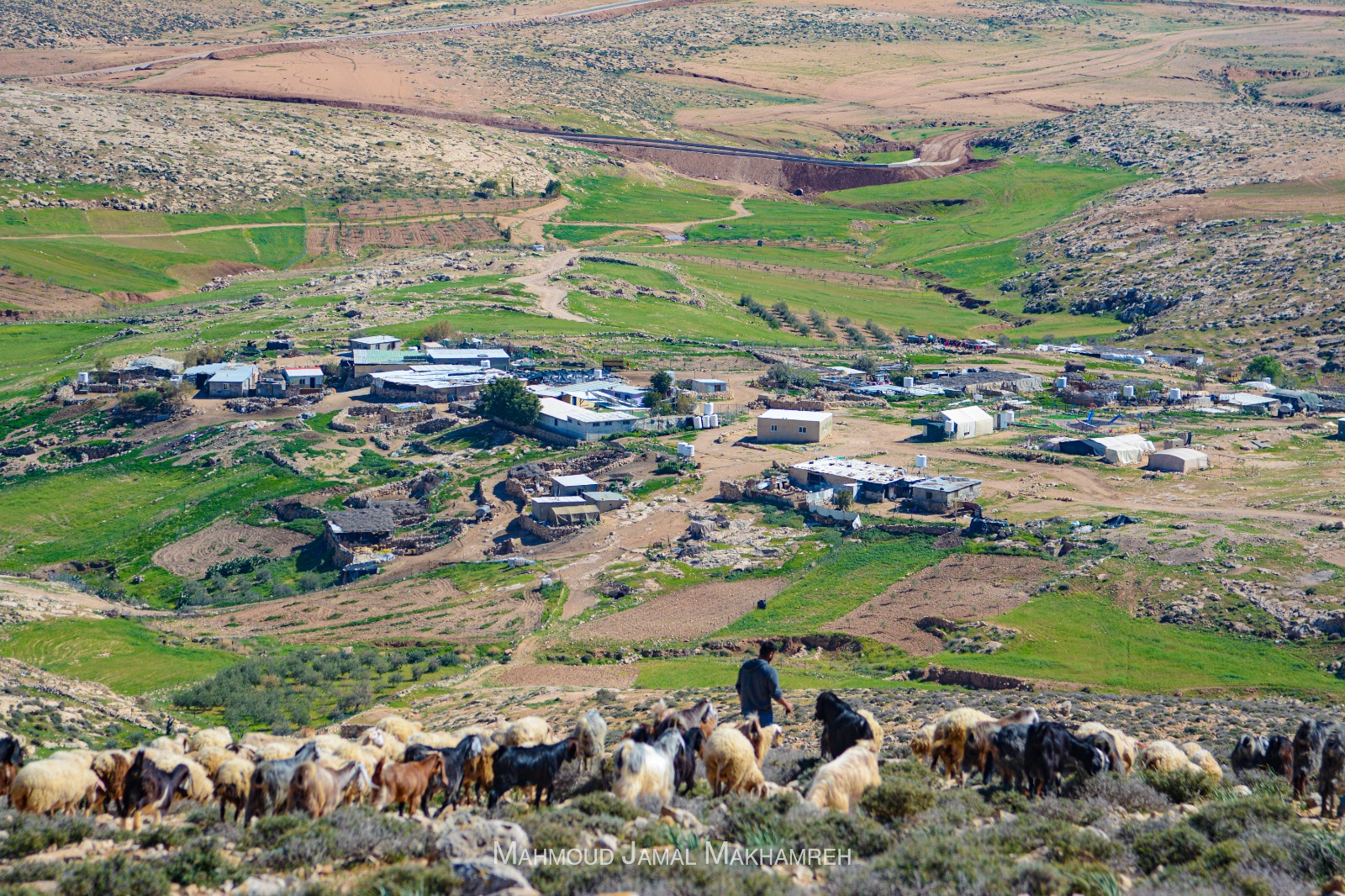
- General view of Jinba, 2024

- Location within the West Bank
- Coordinates: 31°21′49″N 35°08′26″E
- State: State of Palestine
- Governorate: Hebron Governorate
- Area: Masafer Yatta

Population
  - Total: ~150–300 (2,022–2,025 est.)
- Time zone: UTC+2 (UTC+3 DST)

Jinba (Arabic: جنبا) is a Palestinian village located in the south-western corner of Masafer Yatta in the Hebron Governorate, in the southern West Bank. It is administered under Palestinian local frameworks but lies within Area C of the West Bank, under full Israeli civil and military control. The hamlet faces chronic challenges related to displacement, loss of infrastructure, and settler-related violence.

== History and archaeology ==
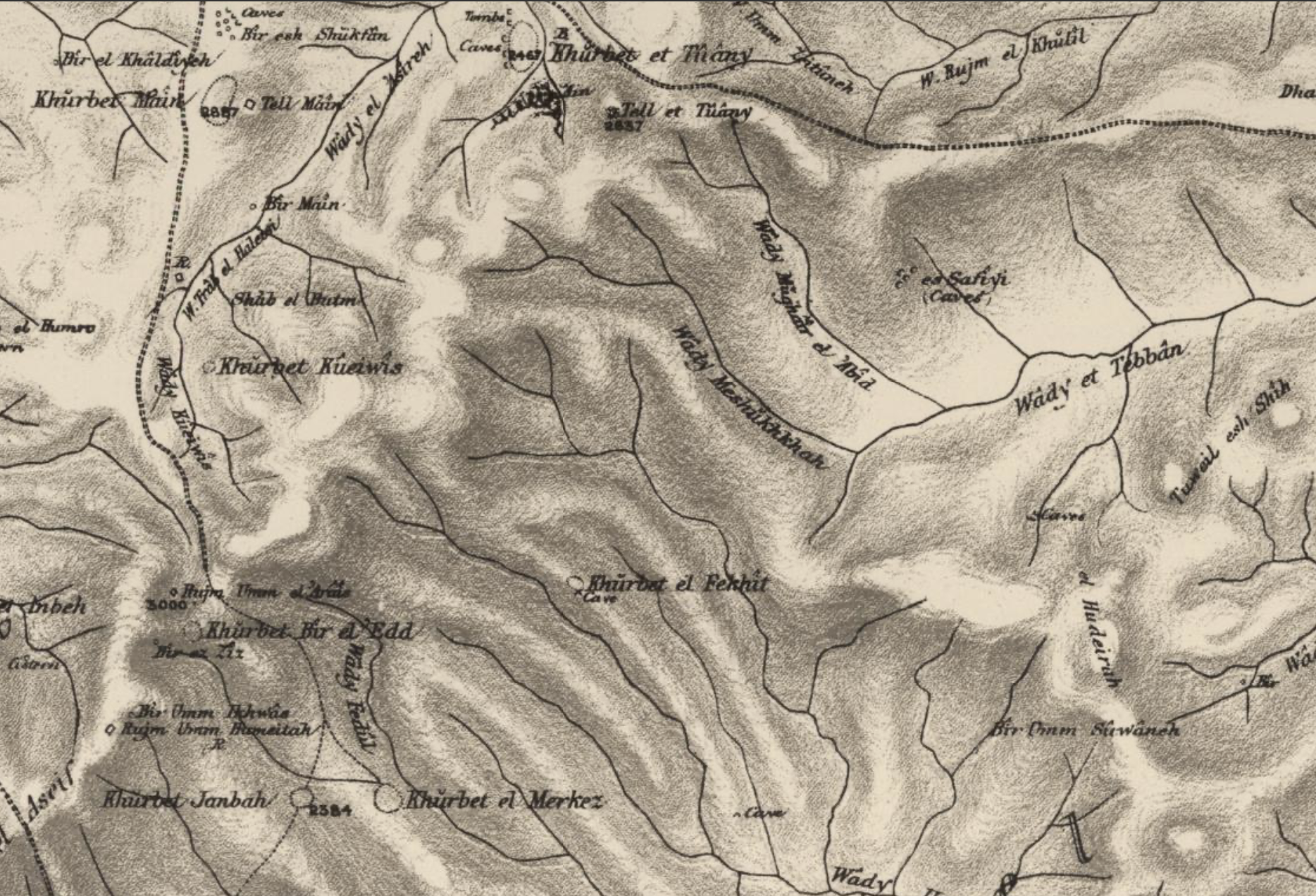
1880s Jinba on the PEF Survey of Palestine map of Masafer Yatta

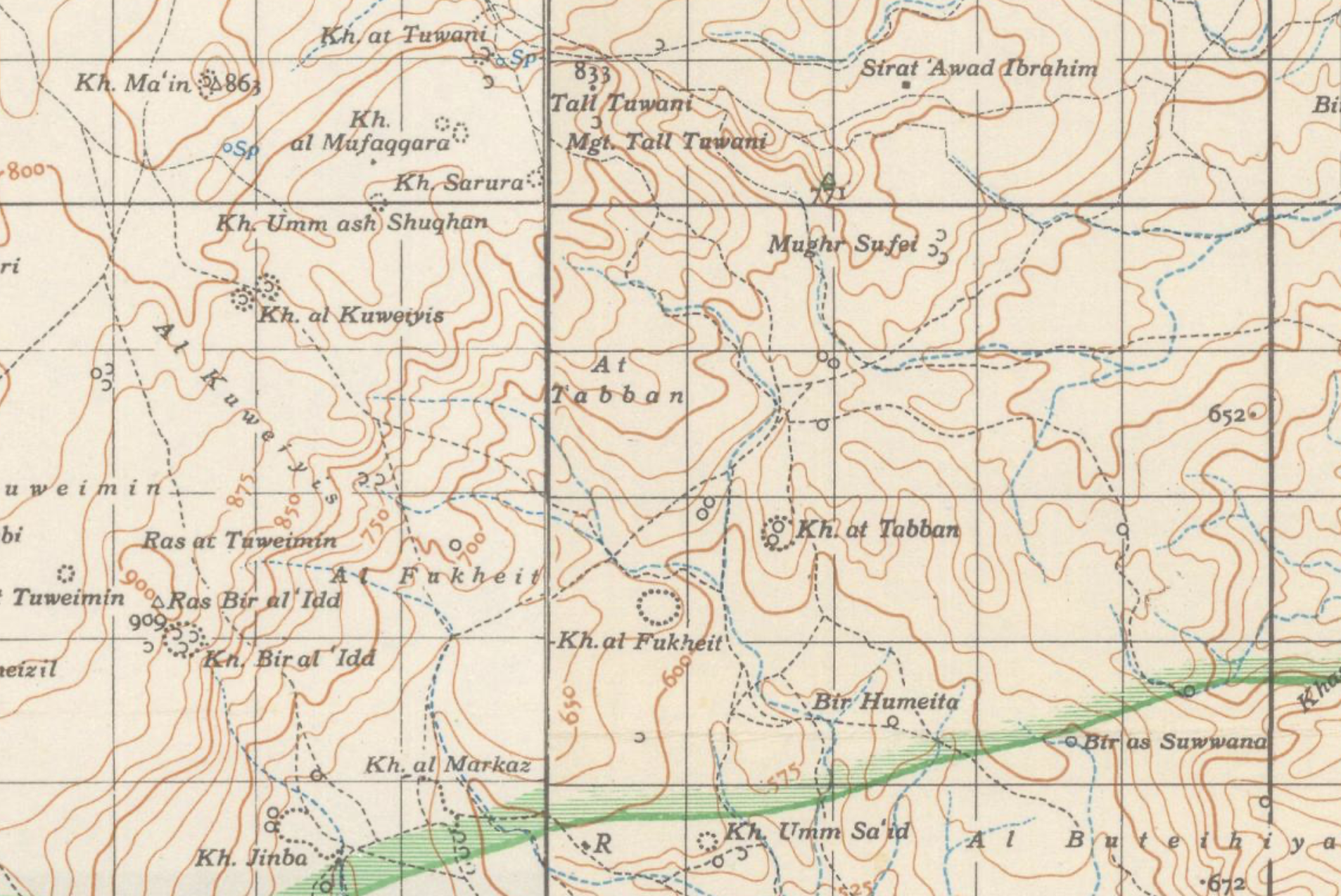
Jinba on 1940s-50s Survey of Palestine map of Masafer Yatta

The Masafer region is called after the Arabic word for 'traveling.' The 2024 documentary film No Other Land, winner of the Best Documentary Oscar, focuses on Jinba.

Jinba is first mentioned as an important stop on the Gaza-Hebron-al-Karak road in the early 14th century.

In 1838, Edward Robinson noted Jinba as a ruin located south of Jabal al-Khalil (the Hebron Hills). It appears Jembeh on Van de Velde's map of Palestine, charted in 1851-1852, and published in 1858. In the 1870s, the Survey of Western Palestine recorded Khurbet Janbah as showing “traces of ruins,” with “foundations and heaps of stones.”

Jinba was resettled by families from Yatta in the 19th century. The area encompasses caves and terraced fields which formed part of longstanding seasonal and permanent habitation. Geographer Natan Shalem noted that Jinba included cave dwellings and flint tools from ancient periods. These suggest a continuity of human presence, though no formal excavations have been reported.

In the British Mandate Period, Jinba's residents relied on a mixed agrarian economy of animal husbandry, orchard cultivation and field crops. Jinba’s residents lived in caves and practiced rainfed agriculture and pastoralism. These practices linked Jinba to neighboring communities such as al-Mufaqara and al-Qaryatain.

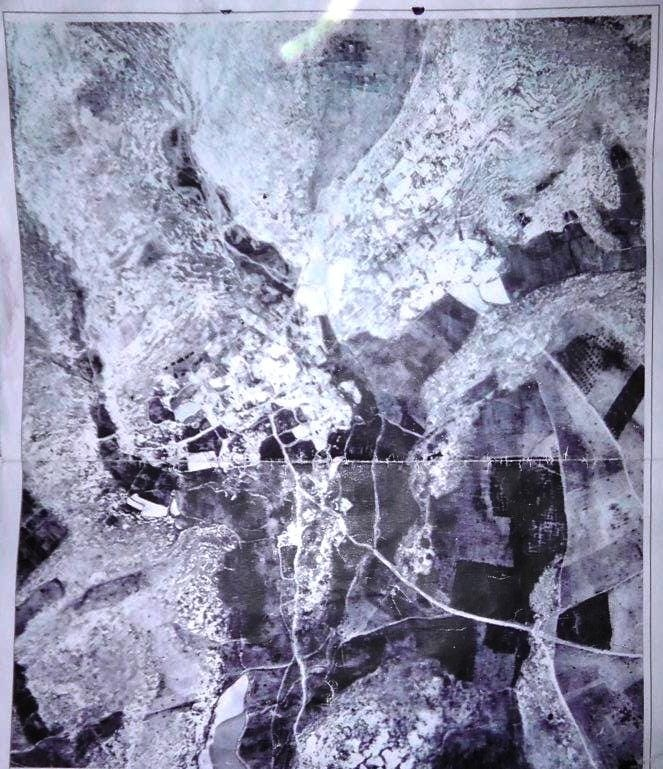
Jinba village in 1945, showing orchards (black), cultivated fields (brown) and sheepfolds and threshing floors (in white)

On 26 May 1951, a group of Israeli paratroopers under the command of Lieutenant-Colonel Ariel Sharon attacked Jinba. The raid, reportedly carried out in retaliation for the theft of sheep from Kibbutz Ein Gedi, resulted in the killing of two Jordanian National Guardsmen and two Palestinian farmers. The raiders also killed two camels before withdrawing without recovering any sheep.

Jinba was one of the targets of the large Israeli military assault of 13 November 1966. According to United Nations observers, 15 stone houses in the village were blown up, seven more were damaged, and livestock including a camel was killed. Israeli tanks and armored vehicles crossed the ceasefire line at dawn and shelled the area before entering the village and detonating explosives inside the houses. Families later received compensation through the Jordanian authorities, who distributed payments from Israel via the Red Cross: 350 Jordanian dinars for each stone house, 100 dinars per camel, and seven dinars per sheep. Oral testimonies from residents such as Halima Abu Aram describe the bombardment, flight to nearby hills, and the destruction of houses and shops that formed a settled village. Stone houses were built around caves from the 1940s, and by 1967 the Israeli occupation itself documented caves as permanent dwellings in its surveys, before later denying the existence of the village.

== Legal-administrative context ==
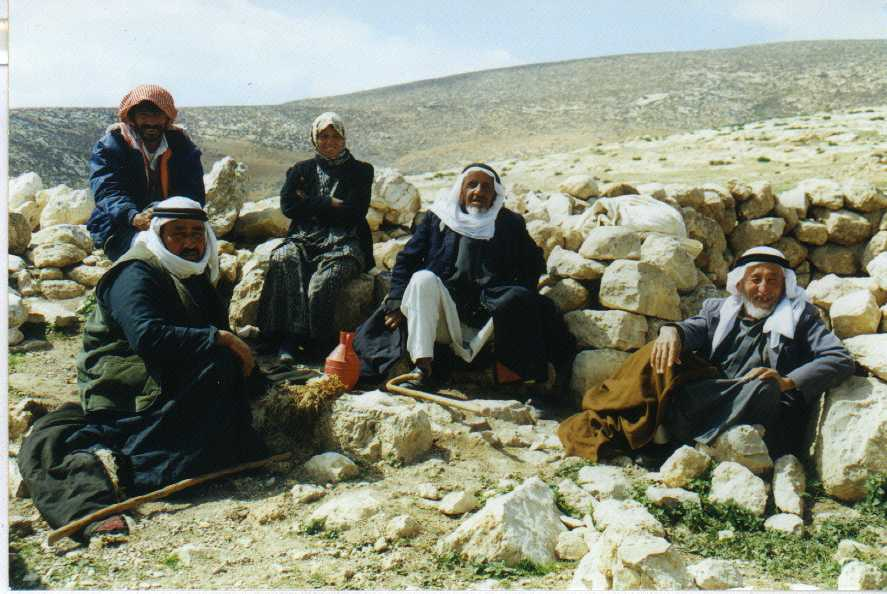
Elders of Jinba, Masafer Yatta, Palestine, 2000

Since 1967, Jinba has fallen within Israel’s declared Firing Zone 918, allowing routine demolitions and displacement under the Israeli military framework.

Jinba’s residents frequently face demolition orders for homes, cisterns, and solar units due to the difficulty of obtaining Israeli-issued building permits. Many inhabitants rely on temporary structures and community cisterns.

== Population and livelihoods ==
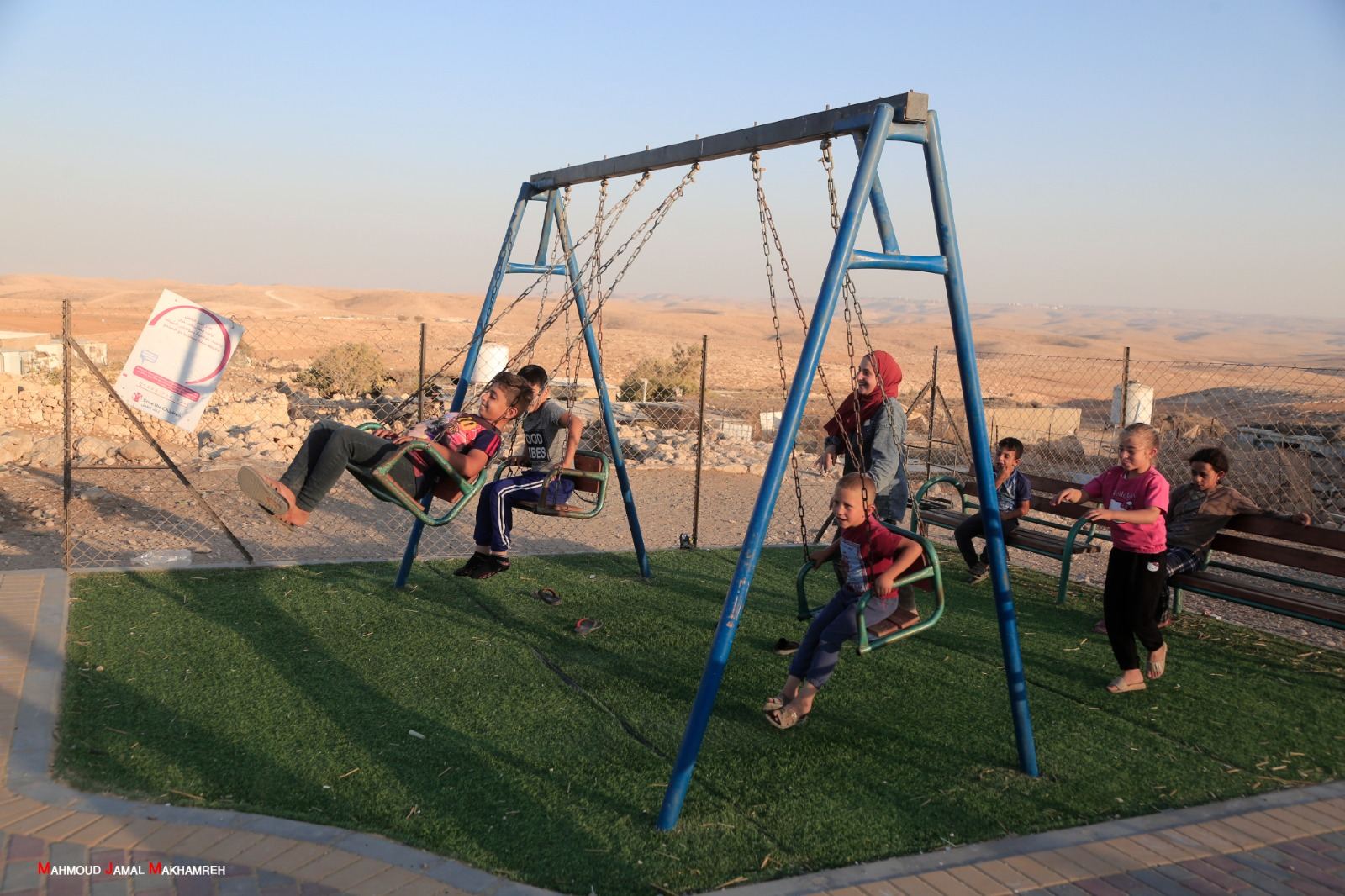
Children playing in Jinba's playground, threatened with demolition

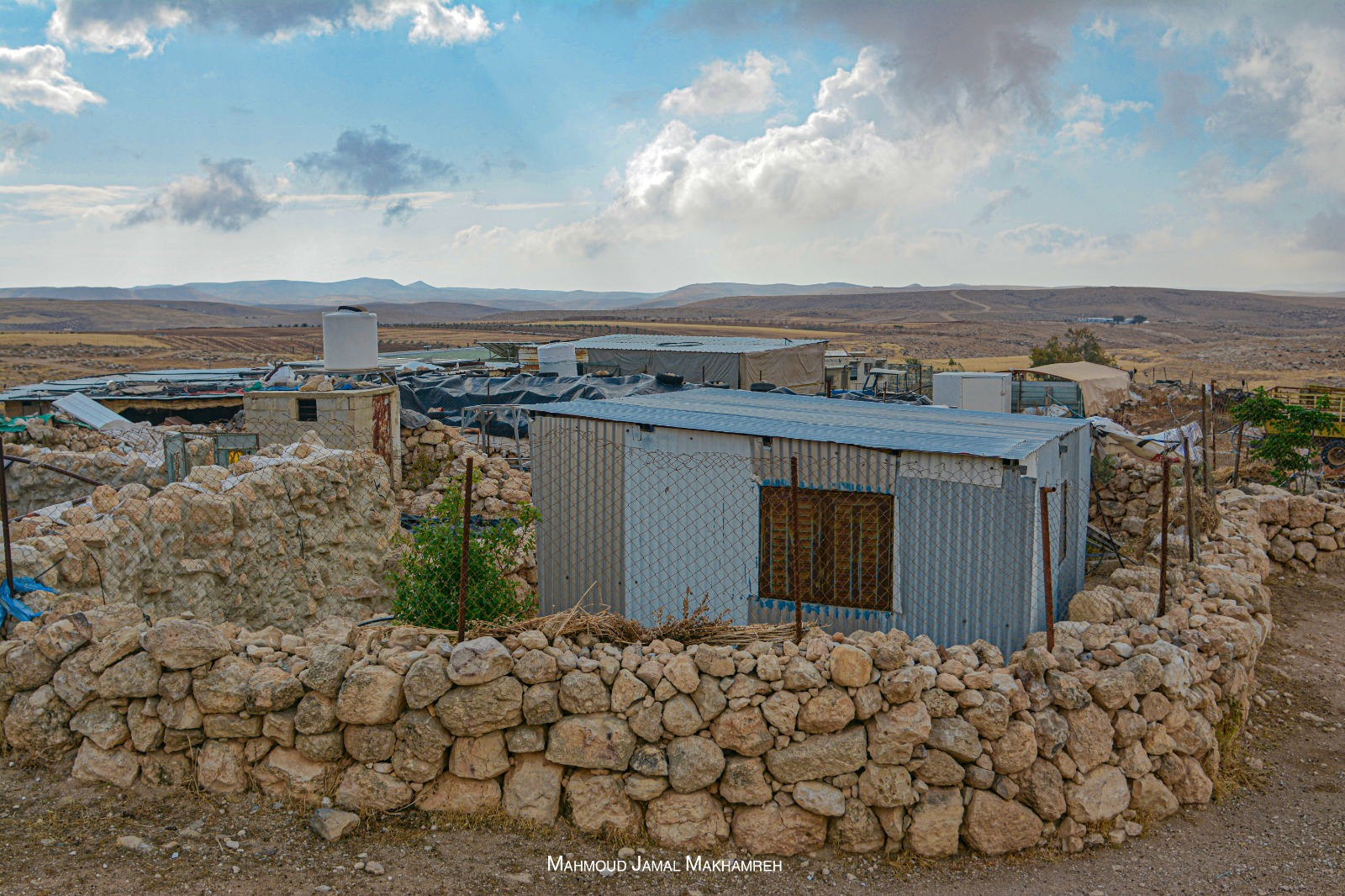
House in Jinba village

Local inhabitants are sedentary farmers, numbering approximately 150–300 in recent years. They speak Arabic and maintain livelihoods based on goat herding, olive cultivation, and grazing. Dependence on water tankers, solar panels, and community cisterns is common due to limited infrastructure access.

== See also ==
- Masafer Yatta
- Israeli settlement
- Israeli settler violence
