= Masafer Yatta =

Palestinian villages south of Hebron, West Bank

- Municipality D

Arabic transcription(s)
  - Arabic: مسافر يطا
  - Latin: Mosfaret Yatta (official)
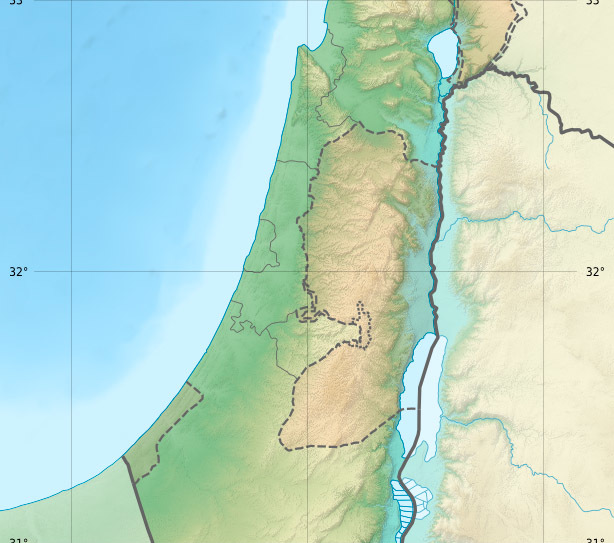
- Location of Masafer Yatta within the West Bank, Palestine
- Coordinates: 31°22′48″N 35°10′51″E
- State: Palestine
- Governorate: Hebron Governorate

Government
  - Type: village council

Area
  - Total: 36.0 km^{2} (13.9 sq mi)

Population (2007)
  - Total: 768
  - Density: 21.3/km^{2} (55.3/sq mi)

Masafer Yatta (Arabic: مسافر يطا, also spelled Mosfaret Yatta) is a collection of 19 Palestinian hamlets which comprise a D-level municipality in the southern West Bank, in the Hebron Governorate of Palestine, located between 14 and 24 kilometres (9–15 mi) south of the city of Hebron, in the South Hebron Hills.

It has been subject to being within an Israeli-declared military "firing zone" since the 1970s. The 2024 documentary film No Other Land, winner of the Best Documentary Oscar, focuses on Masafer Yatta.

== Population and administration ==
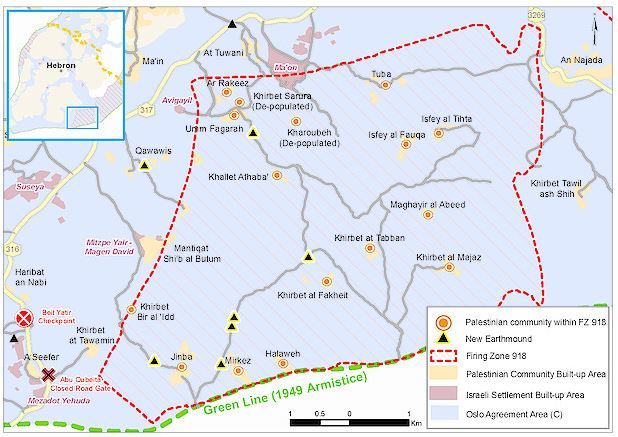
Massafer Yatta in the Hebron Hills, West Bank

Masafer Yatta is administered by a village council, whose members are appointed by the Ministry of Local Affairs of the Palestinian National Authority.

According to the Palestinian Central Bureau of Statistics, nine of the localities that make up Masafer Yatta (Shi'b al-Butm, Khirbet Tawil ash-Shih, Khirbet al-Fakhit, Khirbet Bir al-Idd, Khirbet Isfay al-Fauqa wal-Tahta, Jinba, al-Mirkaz and Maghayir al-Abeed) had a population of 768 in 2007. The villages affected by a 2022 Israeli expulsion order have a population of 1,144, half of them children. Nearby at-Tuwani and Imneizil serve as centers for Masafer Yatta.

== History ==
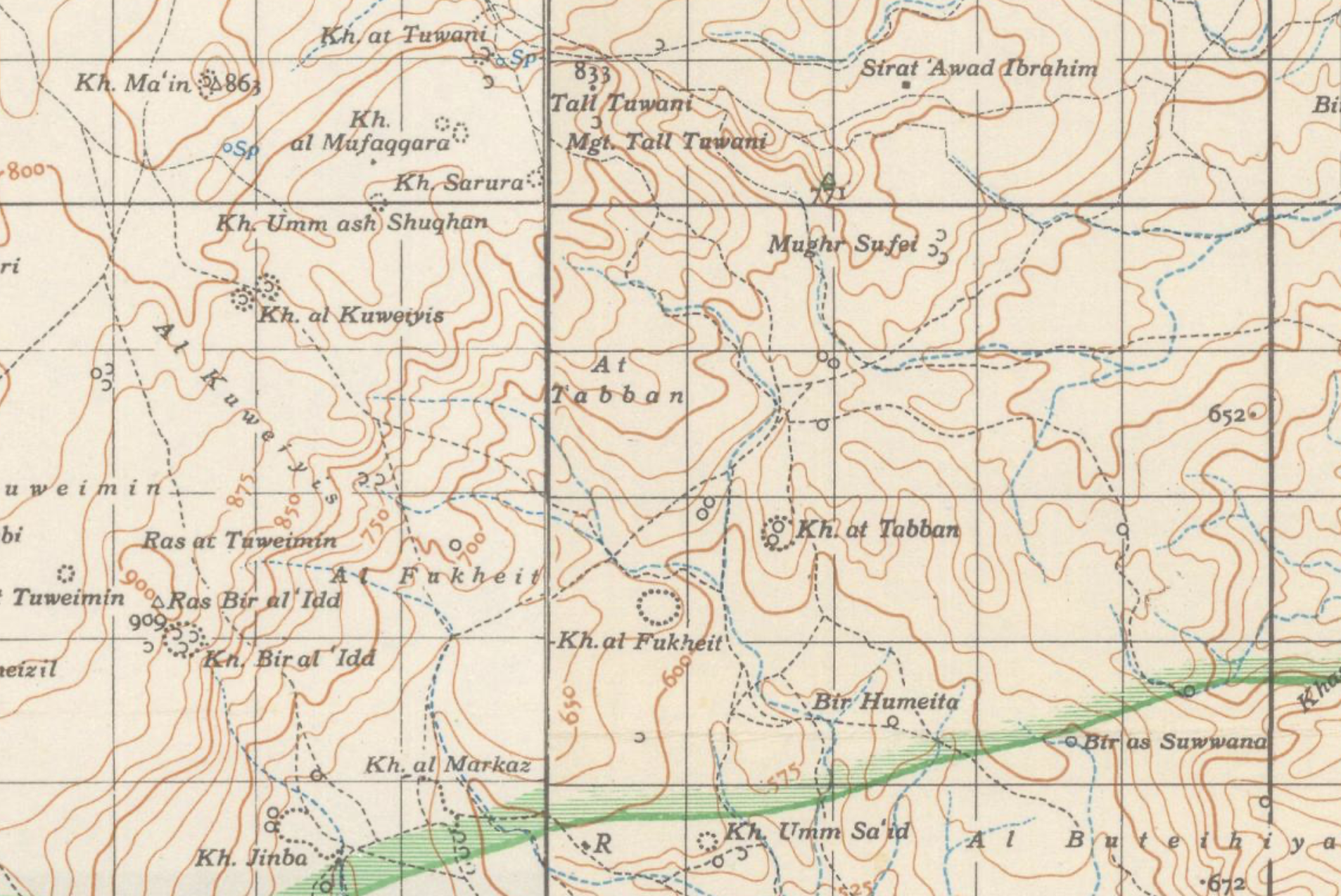
1940s-50s Survey of Palestine map of Masafer Yatta

In 1881, the British Palestine Exploration Fund (PEF) noted the following places: Shảb el Butm, meaning "the spur of the terebinth", Tuweil esh Shîh, meaning "the peak or ridge of Artemisia", Khirbet el Fekhît, meaning "the ruin of the fissure", and Khirbet Bîr el 'Edd, meaning "the ruin of the perennial well". At Khirbet Bîr el 'Edd, PEF noted "traces of ruins, and a cistern", while at Khirbet el Fekhît, they noted "traces of ruins, and a cave".

The name "Masafer Yatta" is believed to derive from the word Mosfaret, which may relate to the Arabic word for "travelling", in light of the distance needed to travel from the town Yatta, or alternatively from the word for "nothing" or "zero", because the area was not suitable for anything.

=== Israeli occupation ===
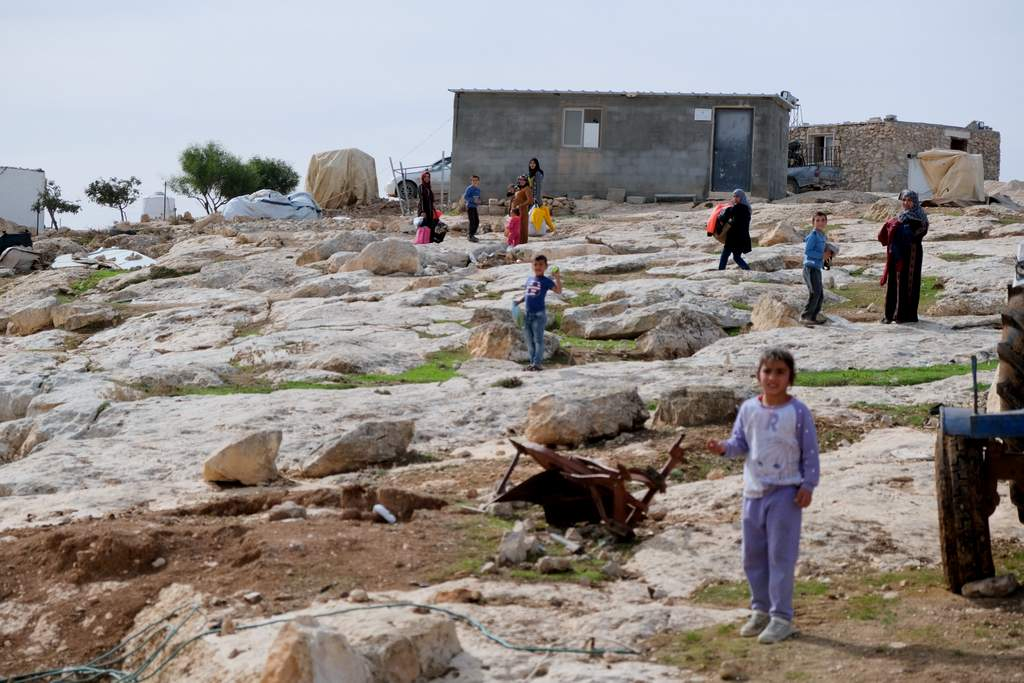
Al-Mafkara, Masafer Yatta, 2021

Since the June War in 1967, Masafer Yatta has been under Israeli occupation. The hamlet cluster is part of "Area C", meaning that Israel has full military and civil control over it. The area is used by the army for military training and was denominated Firing Zone 918 by the Israeli army, after, according to a cabinet minute of 1981, Ariel Sharon had explicitly stated that the purpose of such a redefinition would be to enable the expulsion of the local Palestinian residents. More than a thousand Palestinians risk being expelled from their homes and properties.

According to The Guardian, "Palestinian water cisterns, solar panels, roads and buildings here are frequently demolished on the grounds that they do not have building permits, which are nearly impossible to obtain, while surrounding illegal Israeli settlements flourish. The community are mostly herders, raising goats and sheep throughout scorching summers and freezing winters." Bir el-Eid, which is closest to the unauthorized Israeli settlement Mitzpeh Yair, had their cistern vandalized by having an animal carcass thrown into it.

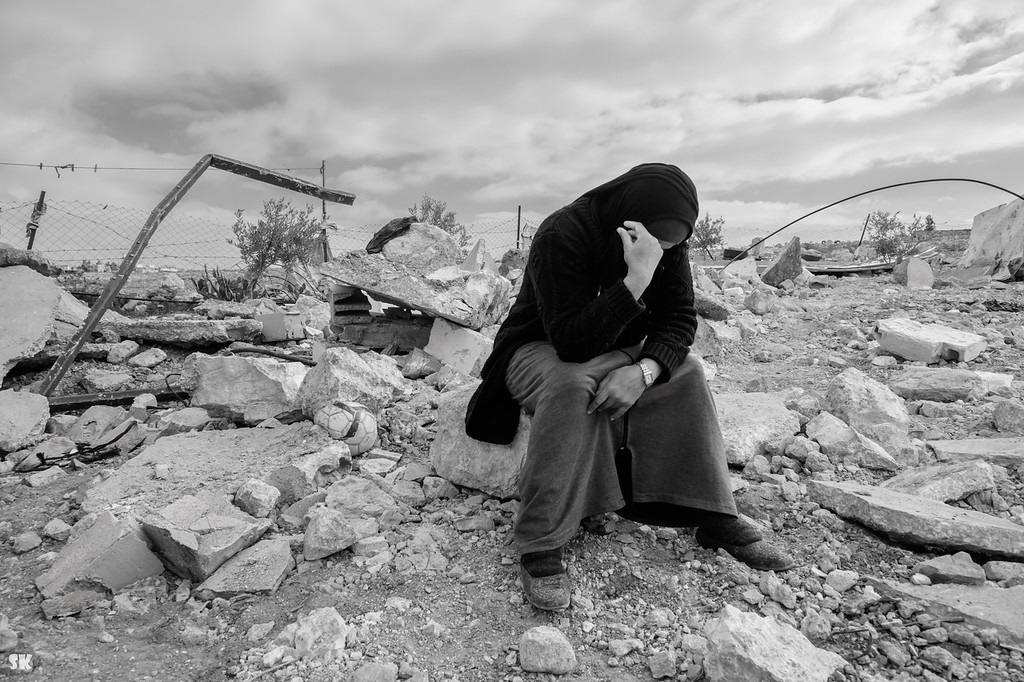
Woman sitting on the ruins of her house destroyed by Israeli authorities in Masafer Yatta, January 2023

The villagers appealed to the Israeli Supreme Court on the grounds that they have evidence of living in the area before the Israeli occupation. Israeli authorities have attempted to relocate the residents to Yatta, supplying aerial photographic evidence which illustrates no or limited signs of habitation prior to the 1990s. Former senior Defense Ministry advisor, Kobi Eliraz reinforced the point, stating, “They never lived there. You don’t see, for example, consistent agricultural cultivation or orchards [in satellite photos]…There are no permanent houses that are clear and visible to the eye,”

However, the appeal from the villages is based on the argument that during the Israeli assault on Samu nearby, in 1966, the villagers of Jinba suffered damage, – the UN documented shortly after 15 houses that had been blown up by Israeli forces-and the damage was formally recognized soon after by the Jordanian government, which paid residents compensation for their losses in April and May 1967: 350 dinars per each stone house destroyed; 100 dinars for every killed camel, and seven for each sheep. It is argued to the contrary that what was blown up were Bedouin tents. Yet the Israeli geographer Natan Shalem, in his book Midbar Yehuda (Judean Desert) in 1931, stated that several villages there were not Bedouin nomadic encampments. Other evidence attests to the existence of inhabited sites outside Yatta-Jinba, Mirkaz, al-Mifqara, al-Fakhit, al-Tabban, al-Majaz, Sarura, Simra, Maghayir Al-Abeed, al-Halawa, Sfay al-Fauqa wal-Tahta, al-Rakiz, al-Tuba, and Khalet a-Daba – long before the occupation.

=== Attack by Israeli settlers ===
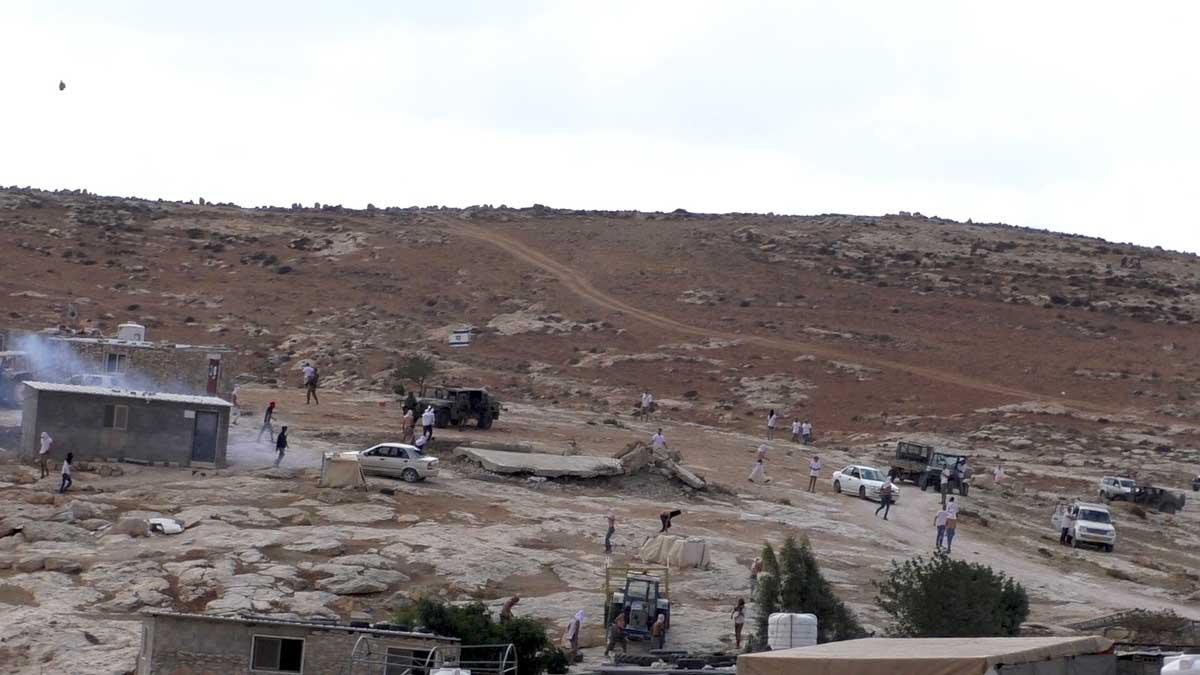
Settlers attack on Al Mufakara, September 2021

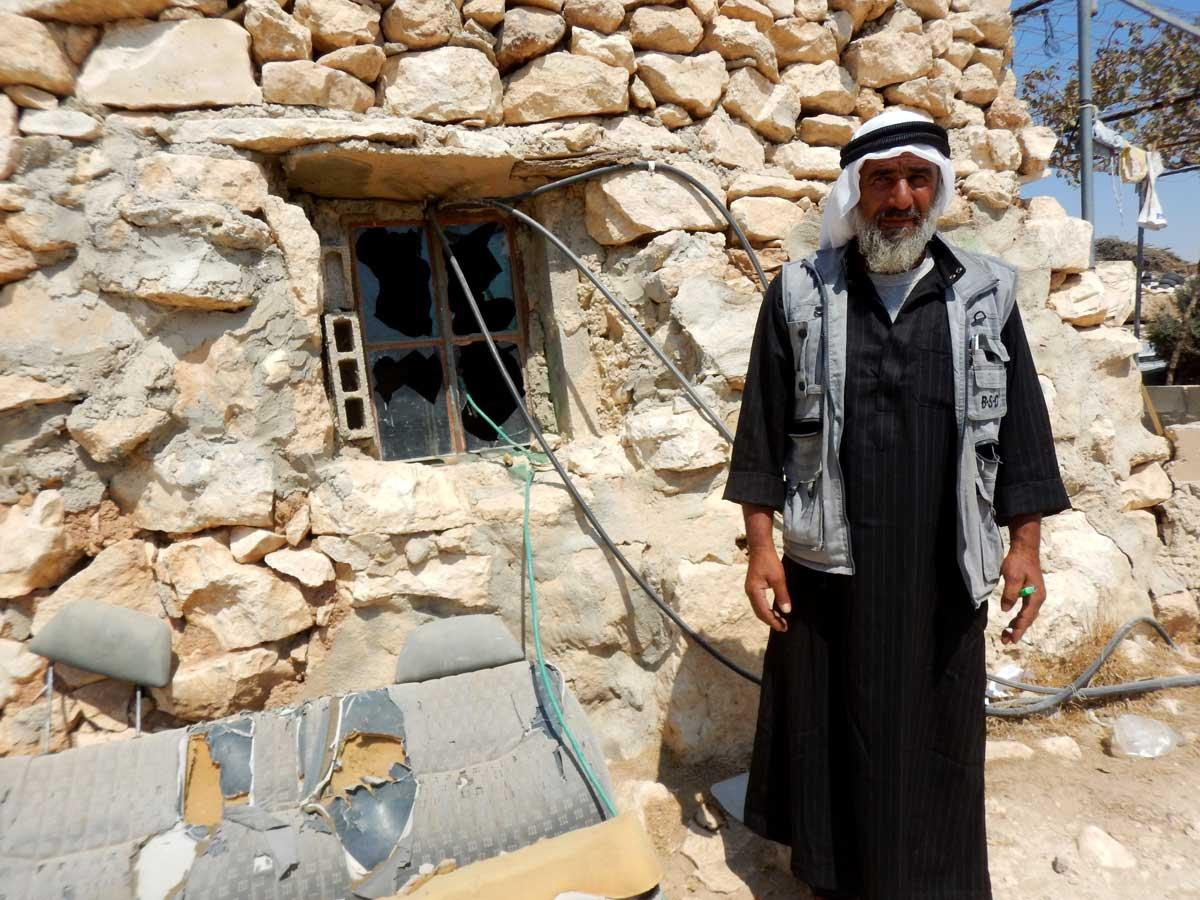
Shattered window from the settlers attack on Al Mufakara

In September 2021, a mob of approximately 80 to 100 masked Israeli settlers invaded the village of Khirbat al-Mufkara, one of the hamlets that compose Masafer Yatta, throwing stones at houses and damaging cars; 12 Palestinians were injured, including a three-year-old Palestinian child who was hit in the head when an Israeli settler threw a stone at him while he was asleep inside his home.

Settlers purposely grazing in a Palestinian orchard at al-Rakiz, Masafer Yatta

Foreign Minister Yair Lapid reacted by calling it a "violent incident", "horrific, and it is terror. This isn't the Israeli way, and it isn't the Jewish way. This is a violent and dangerous fringe, and we have a responsibility to bring them to justice."

In March 2025, dozens of Israeli settlers attacked Palestinians and property in Jinba, close to Masafer Yatta, reportedly injuring 6 Palestinians, with Israel security forces reporting that this came after reports of attacks against Jews/Israelis south of Masafer Yatta and near Mitzpe Yair; The Times of Israel reported that the Israeli security forces arrested 22 Palestinians from Jinba, and did not arrest any Israeli settlers due to the incident.

There were further attacks in 2026, with Basel Adra writing for +972 Magazine that a "pogrom" had occurred in January, reporting that "settlers set homes ablaze and looted livestock across three villages for over five hours, Israeli soldiers blocked ambulances, arrested victims, and even took part in beatings."

There were attacks in Masafer Yatta in March 2026 as part of a broader series of attacks by settlers throughout the West Bank.

=== Forcible transfer ===
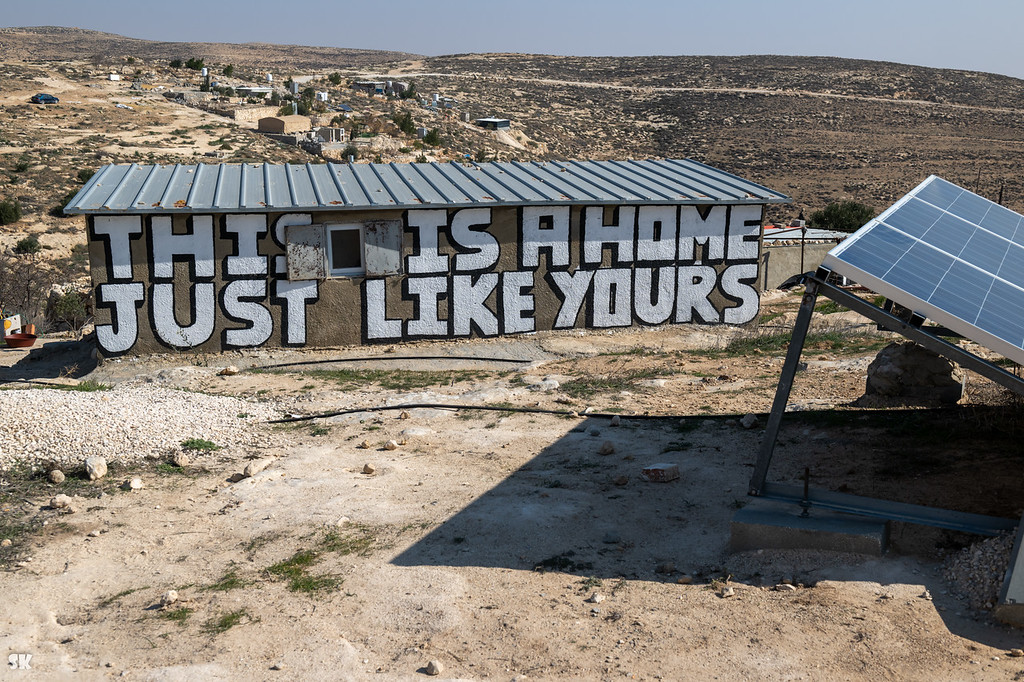
Protest sign on a house under threat of demolition, Khallet Athaba, January 2023

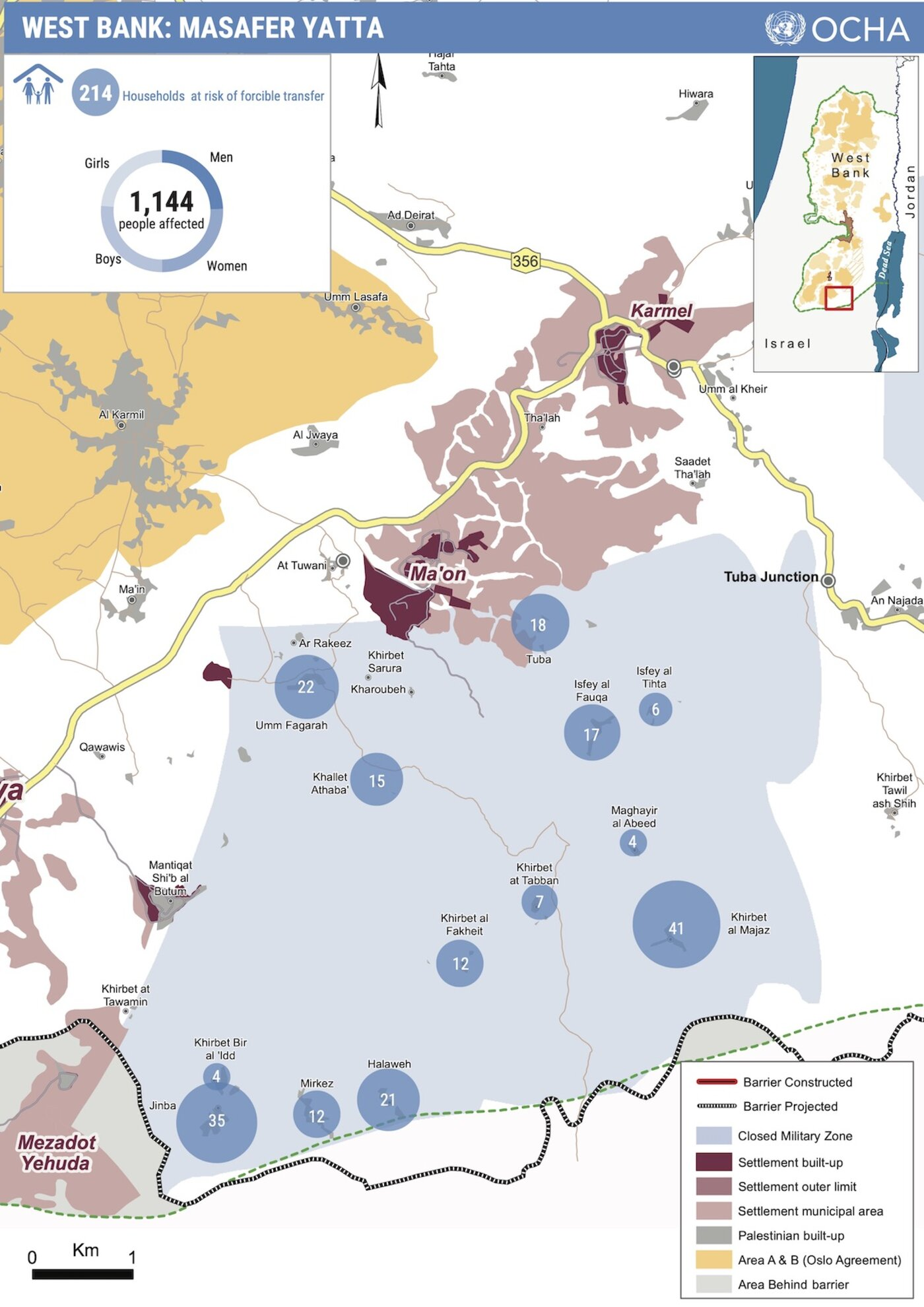
Households at risk of forcible transfer

In May 2022, the Israeli Supreme Court endorsed the IDF position regarding an area of 3,000 hectares (7,400 acres) in which 12 Palestinian villages are sited, paving the way for the expulsion of 1,000 residents, which would be the largest deportation since the 1970s. One of the judges involved in the ruling, David Mintz, resides in the Israeli settlement of Dolev in the West Bank. On 10 May, the European Union said "settlement expansion, demolitions, and evictions are illegal under international law", and that setting up a firing zone is not an "imperative military reason" for transfer of an occupied population.

Once demolitions got underway, one family in one of the affected villages, Khirbet al-Fakhit, cleared out space in a cavern for themselves and their livestock to tide them over winter. The homes of 80 people in Khallet Athaba were scheduled to be bulldozed on 29 September 2022. Access to grazing land used by the shepherds was, according to local herders, subsequently taken over by settlers, and both charities attempting to assist the affected communities and activists endeavouring to defend them from settlers were denied permission to enter the zone's perimeter for lack of travel permits.

The United Nations stated that Israeli actions could amount to a war crime. On 2 January 2023, B'Tselem described the expulsions as a "fast-track war crime".

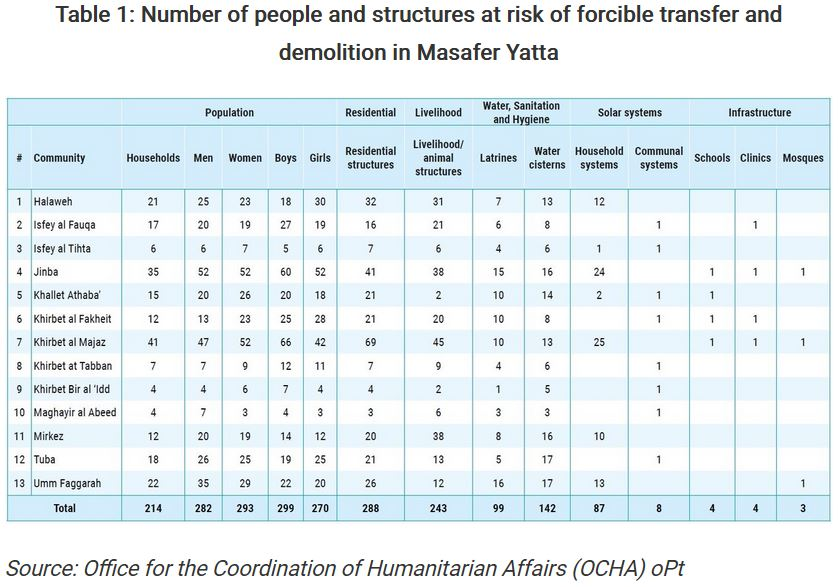
Forced transfer in Masafer Yatta

A June 2022 fact sheet showing the Masafer Yatta communities at risk of displacement was published by the United Nations Office for the Coordination of Humanitarian Affairs, showing 214 households and 288 residences.

== In Nakba scholarship ==
Ilan Pappé's essay Everyday Evil in Palestine: The View from Lucifer's Hill looks at Masafer Yatta as a case study of the daily occurrences of "incremental colonization, ethnic cleansing, and oppression" that are emblematic of the ongoing Nakba of the Palestinian people. Lucifer Hill is a rise overlooking Masafer Yatta where Pappé notes "both the oppression and the resistance to it are visible", and where he notes that "all anyone needs to grasp the realities of this ongoing oppression is one hill, and one hour". It is also one of the places in the West Bank that Ariel Handel identified in 2009 in a "map of disaster".

Pappé charts the evolution of the efforts to drive Masafer Yatta's residents from the area, from the expropriation of Palestinian land by Israel by means of the World Zionist Organization and the Israeli government's designation of grazing lands as forbidden for human settlement to the more method of driving out the residents by destroying water facilities and declaring surrounding areas as firing zones. In what Pappé terms a method of ethnic cleansing, much of Masafer Yatta had already been declared a firing zone by 1977, codenamed Firing Zone 918, allowing the Israeli army to demolish houses, burn crops, stop wells and block access to fields – a method that has been used even more extensively since 1999.

== Cultural references ==
The documentary film No Other Land, which won the Academy Award for Best Documentary Feature Film in 2025, focuses on the effects of the Israeli occupation of Masafer Yatta.
