= Al-Mirkaz =

Hamlet in Hebron Governorate, Palestine

Al-Mirkaz المركز(Arabic)
- Village / hamlet
- Location within the West Bank
- Coordinates: 31°21′49″N 35°09′04″E
- State: State of Palestine
- Governorate: Hebron Governorate
- Area: Masafer Yatta

Population
  - Total: ~150–300 (2,022–2,025 est.)
- Time zone: UTC+2 (UTC+3 DST)

Al-Mirkaz (Arabic: المركز) is a small Palestinian hamlet located in the Masafer Yatta region of the Hebron Governorate, in the southern West Bank. It is administered under Palestinian local frameworks but lies within Area C of the West Bank, under direct Israeli civil and military occupation. The hamlet faces chronic challenges related to displacement, loss of infrastructure, and settler-related violence.

== History and archaeology ==
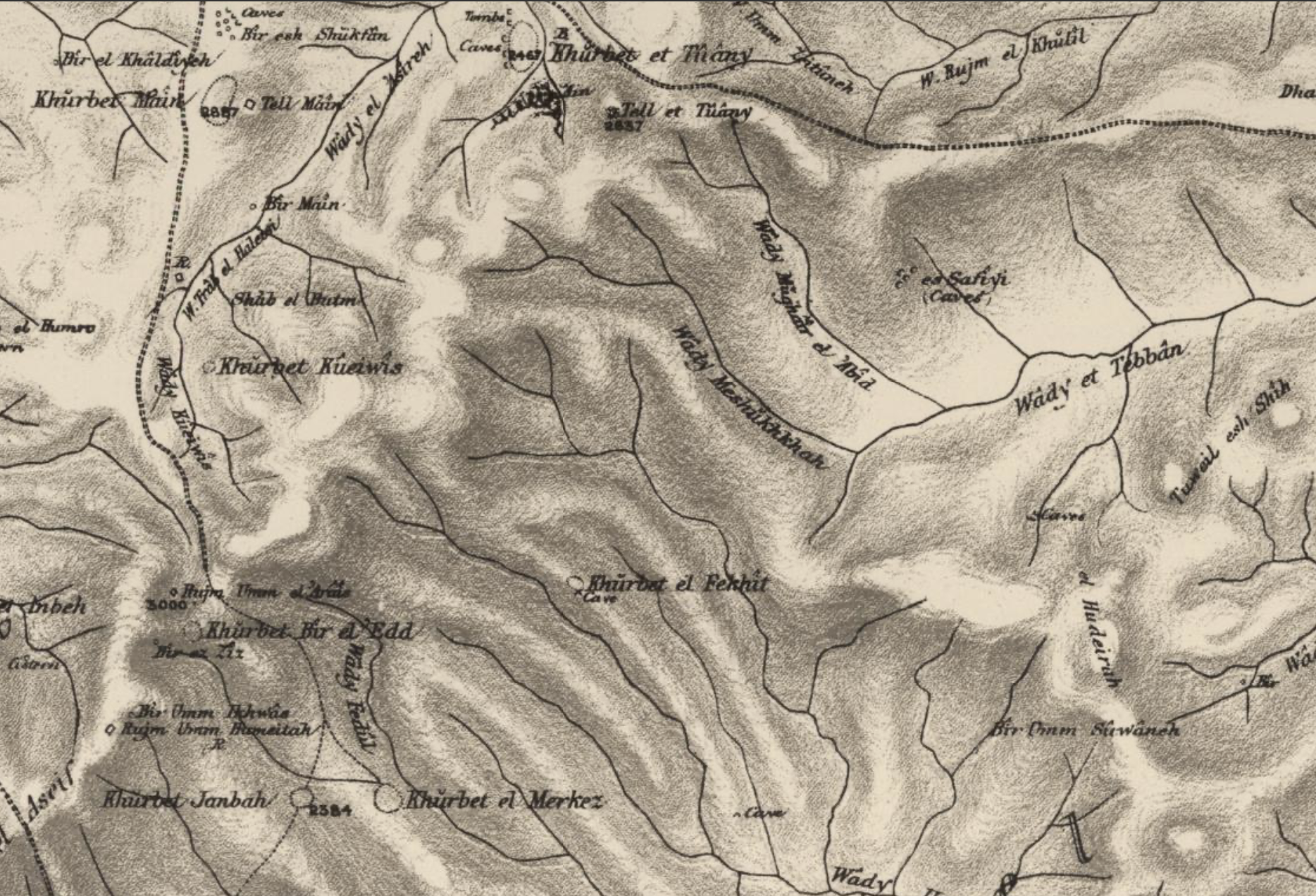
1880s al-Mirkaz on the PEF Survey of Palestine map of Masafer Yatta

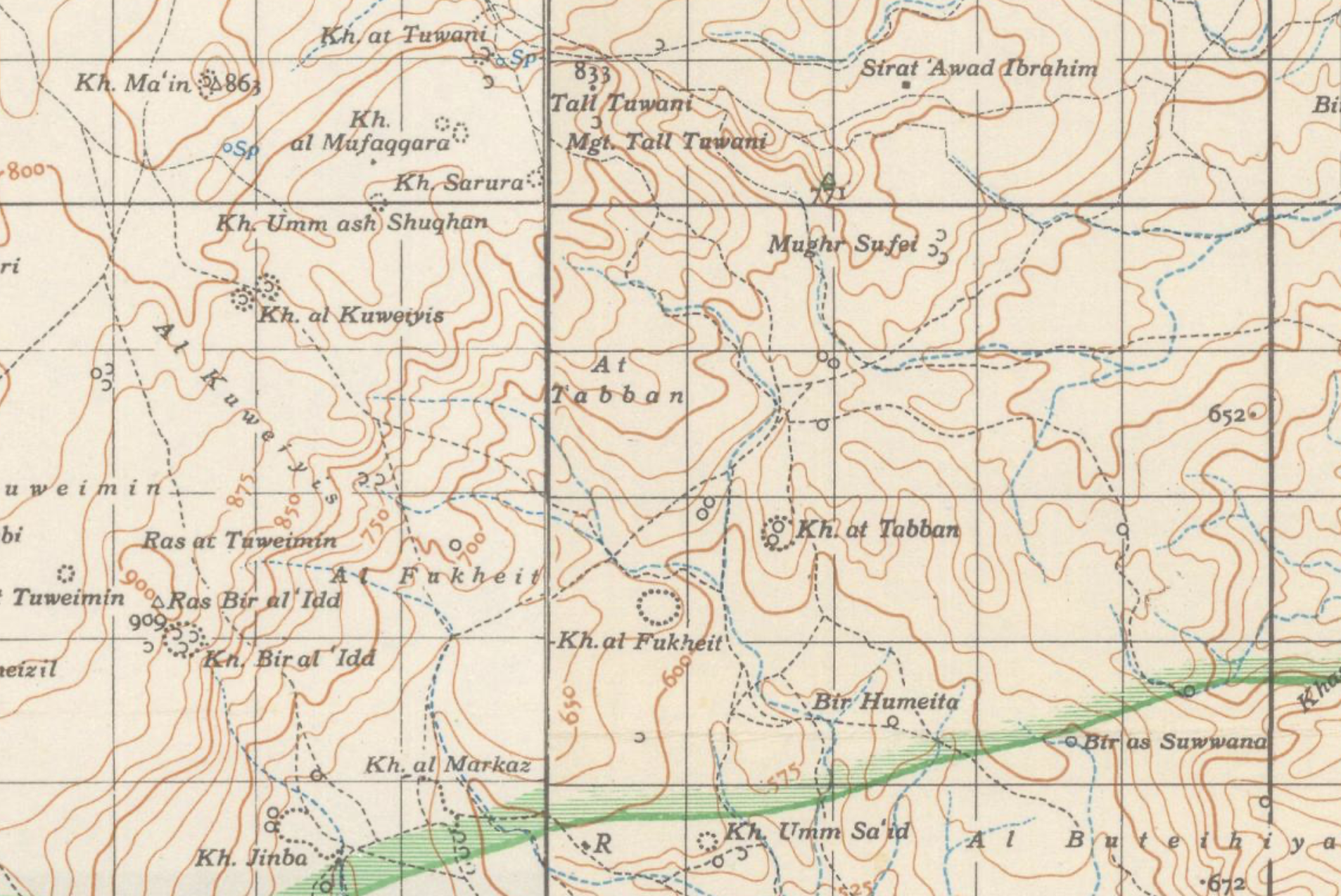
al-Mirkaz on 1940s-50s Survey of Palestine map of Masafer Yatta

The site appears as "Mirkus or Mirkad", on Van de Velde's map of Palestine, charted in 1851-1852, and published in 1858.

According to the 1870s Survey of Western Palestine, Khurbet el-Merkez contained “traces of ruins,” including “foundations and heaps of stones.”

Al-Mirkaz was settled by families from Yatta in the 19th century. The area encompasses caves and terraced fields that local scholars and residents identify as part of longstanding seasonal and permanent habitation. In the British Mandate Period, Al-Mirkaz's residents relied on a mixed agrarian economy of animal husbandry, orchard cultivation and field crops. Natan Shalem, the geographer who surveyed the area in 1931, recorded Markaz as one of the Yatta offshoot villages with caves, water cisterns, and cultivated fields, emphasizing its permanent nature long before 1967.

Khirbet al-Markaz was shelled during an Israeli assault of November 1966. UN Security Council records describe Israeli tanks and armored vehicles bombarding the settlement before troops entered and blew up houses. Israel later argued that the area was only sporadically inhabited.

== Legal-administrative context ==
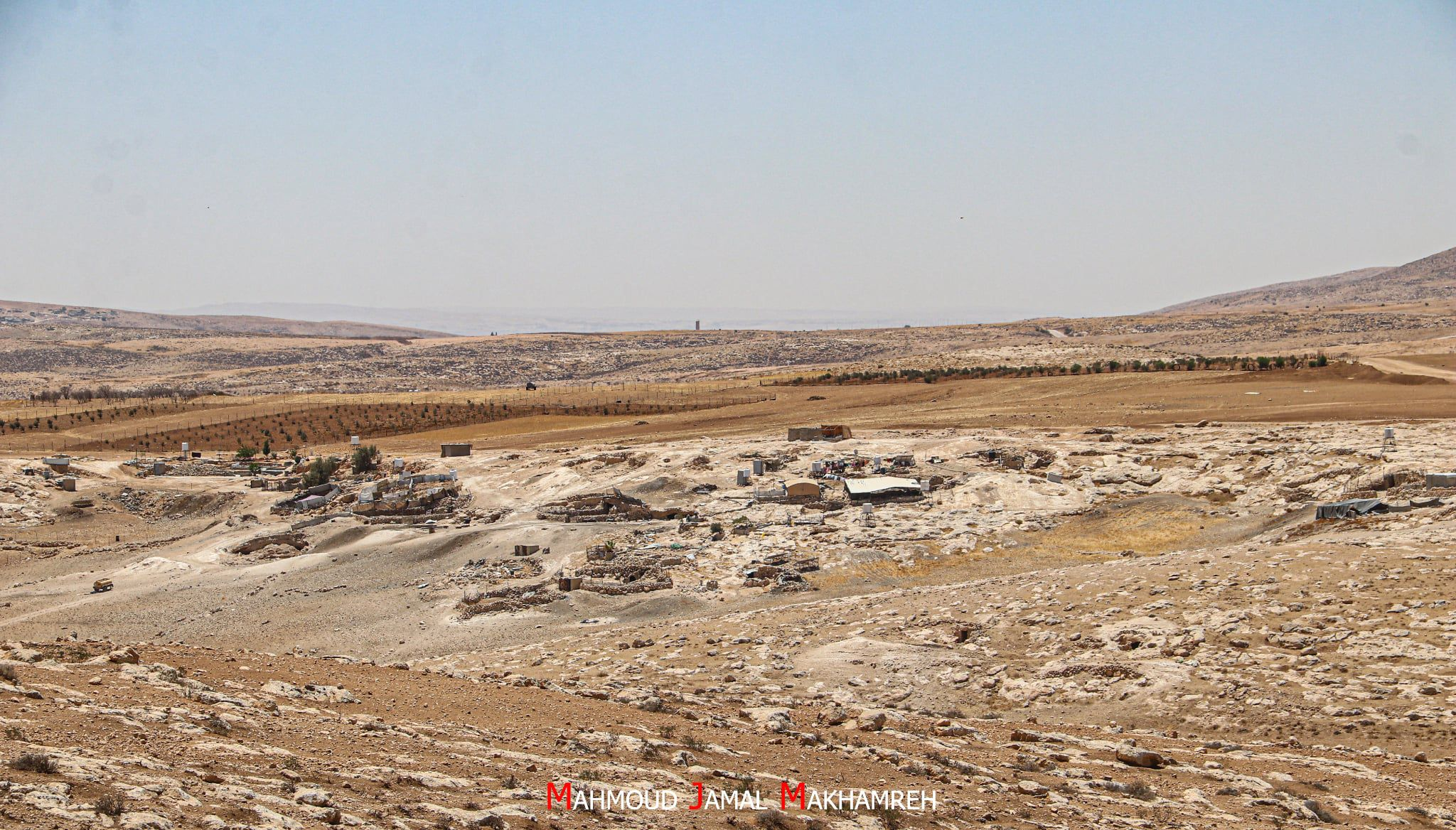
Al-Mirkaz, Masafer Yatta, general view

Since 1967, Al-Mirkaz has fallen within Israel’s declared Firing Zone 918, allowing routine demolitions and displacement under the Israeli military framework. A 2022 Israeli Supreme Court ruling upheld eviction orders affecting eight penalized hamlets in Masafer Yatta, potentially impacting over 2,000 residents.

Al-Mirkaz’s residents face demolition orders for homes, cisterns, and solar units due to inability obtaining Israeli-issued building permits.

The increasing harassment and violence have compelled many families to leave al-Mirkaz, a process which NGOs described as "ethnic cleansing".

== Population ==
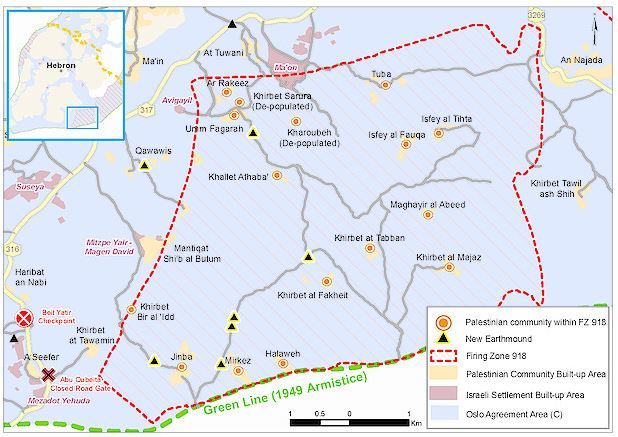
Massafer Yatta in the Hebron Hills, West Bank

Local inhabitants are sedentary farmers, numbering approximately 150–300 in recent years. Dependence on water tankers, solar panels, and community cisterns is common due to limited infrastructure access.

== See also ==
- Masafer Yatta
- Israeli settlement
- Israeli settler violence
