= Imneizil =

Imneizil إمنيزل
- Village
- Location of Imneizil within Palestine
- Coordinates: 31°22′17″N 35°06′23″E
- State: Palestine
- Governorate: Hebron Governorate

Government
  - Type: Village council
- Elevation: 700 m (2,300 ft)

Population (2017)
  - Total: 278

Imneizil (Arabic: إمنيزل) is a small Palestinian village in the Hebron Governorate of the southern West Bank, located about 17 kilometres southwest of Hebron and east of Yatta. The village stands at an elevation of roughly 700 metres above sea level. According to the 2017 census conducted by the PCBS, it had a population of 278.

== Geography ==
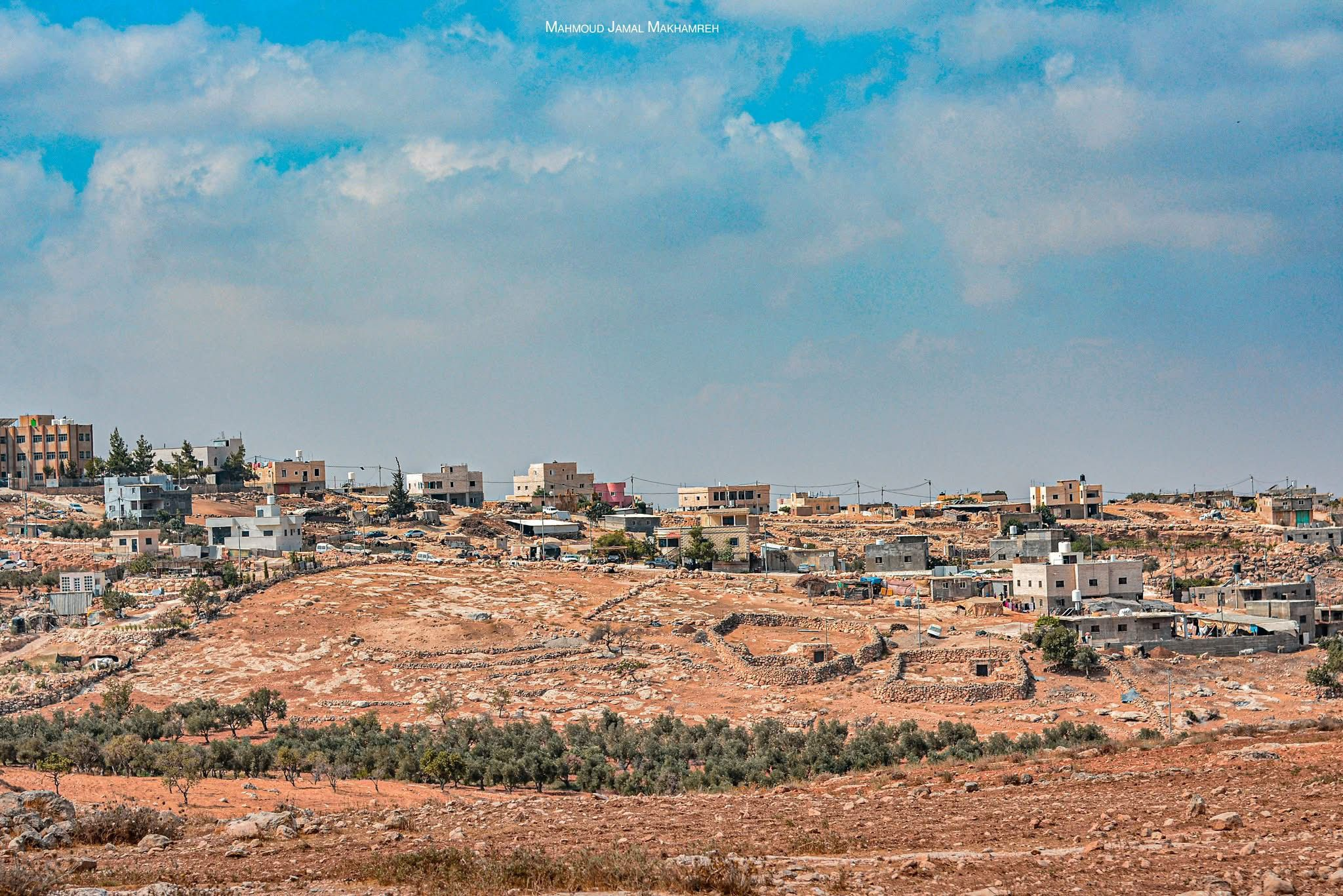
Imneizil, Masafer Yatta - General view

Imneizil lies in the South Hebron Hills, a semi-arid region of scattered hamlets and agricultural land. The terrain is characterized by rocky hills and seasonal grazing areas, similar to the surrounding cluster of villages known collectively as Masafer Yatta.

Although Imneizil itself is not formally included within the boundaries of Firing Zone 918 declared by Israel in the 1970s, it is situated in the same geographical zone, and residents experience many of the restrictions on planning, movement, and access to resources that affect neighbouring hamlets.

== History ==
In the 1870s, Survey of Western Palestine recorded Khurbet el Menâzil as having “caves, cisterns, foundations, and heaps of stones.”

== Demographics ==
As of the 2017 PCBS census, Imneizil had 278 residents. By comparison, the larger grouping of villages in Masafer Yatta—which includes 19 hamlets east of Yatta—recorded 768 residents in the 2007 census. In 2022, approximately 1,144 residents of Masafer Yatta were subject to expulsion orders following Israeli High Court rulings related to the firing zone designation, about half of them children.

== Administration ==
Imneizil, like other small villages in the Hebron Governorate, falls under the jurisdiction of the Palestinian National Authority. Local governance is typically carried out through a village council appointed by the Ministry of Local Government, a model shared with the nearby Masafer Yatta communities.

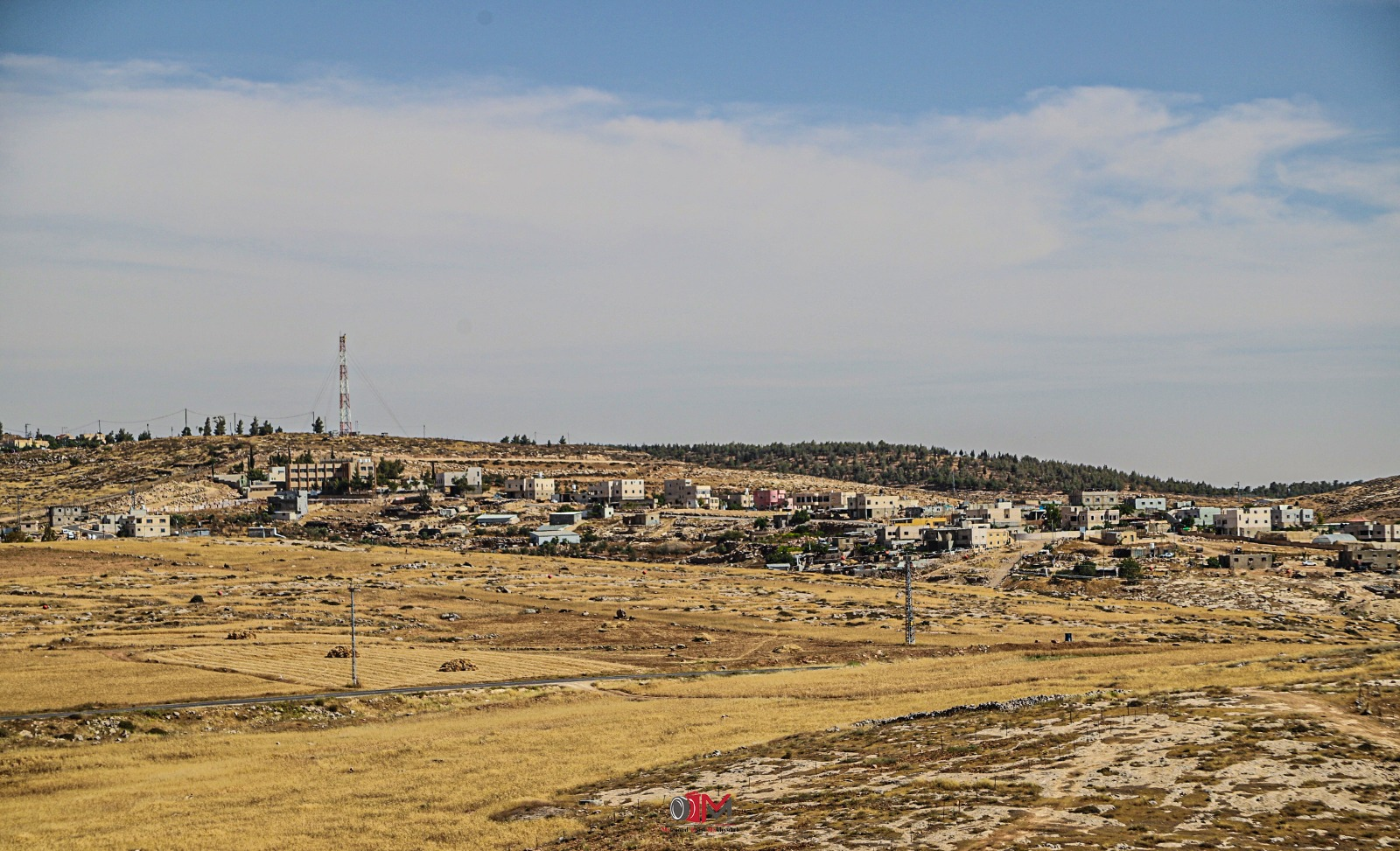
Mneizil village, Masafer Yatta

== See also ==
- Masafer Yatta
- Hebron Governorate
- South Hebron Hills
