= Al-Halawa =

Village in Hebron, State of Palestine

Khirbat al-Khalawa خربة الحلاوة
- Village / hamlet
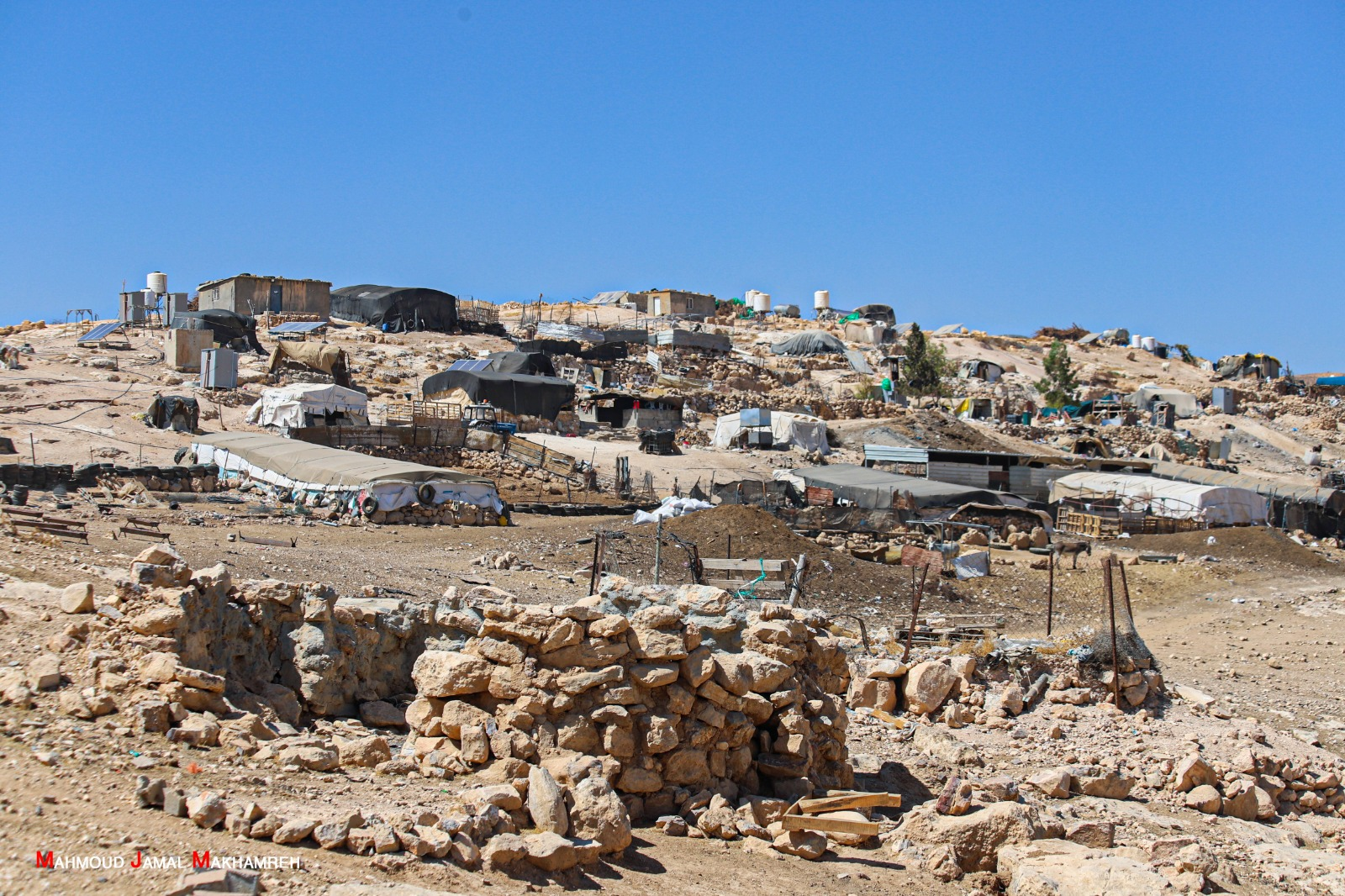
- General view of Khirbat al-Halawa, 2025

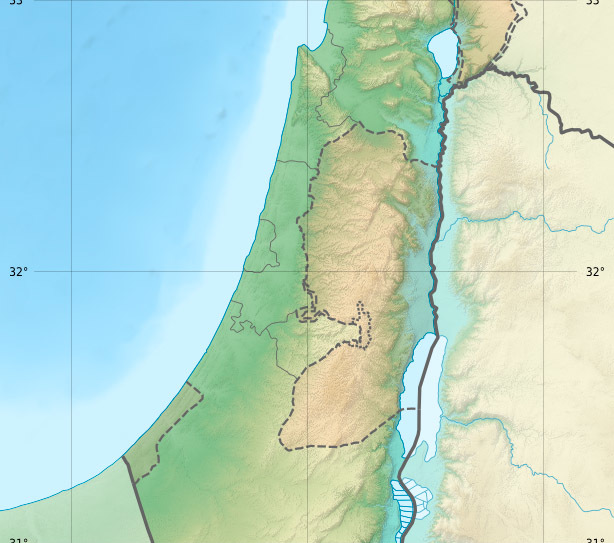
- Location within the West Bank, Palestine
- Coordinates: 31.3697°N 35.1046°E
- State: State of Palestine
- Governorate: Hebron Governorate
- Area: Masafer Yatta
- Elevation: 720 m (2,360 ft)

Population
  - Total: ~120–250 (2,022–2,025 est.)
- Time zone: UTC+02:00
  - Summer (DST): UTC+03:00

al-Halawi or Khirbet al-Halawa (Arabic: خربة الحلاوة) is a small Palestinian hamlet located in the Masafer Yatta area of the Hebron Governorate, in the southern West Bank. Like other hamlets in Masafer Yatta, it is administered under Palestinian local frameworks but lies within Area C of the West Bank, under direct Israeli civil and military occupation. Residents face ongoing threats of demolition, restricted access to infrastructure, and settler-related attacks.

== History and archaeology ==
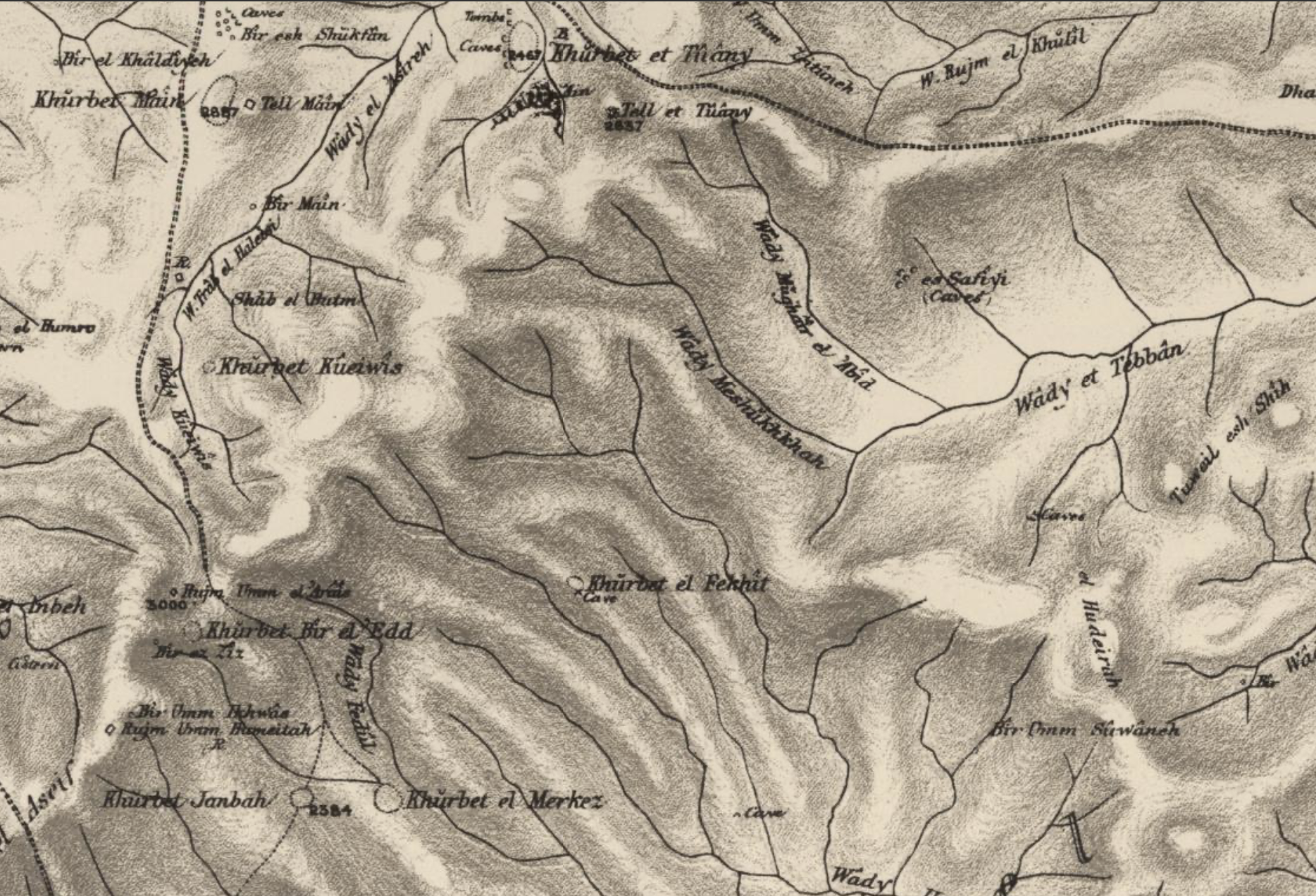
Khirbet al-Halawa area on the PEF Survey of Palestine map of the southern Hebron Hills, 1880s

The name Khirbat al-Halawa (lit. "ruin of sweet candy") is refers to a prominent local landmark. The broader Masafer Yatta region takes its name from the Arabic word for “travelling,” reflecting its history as a seasonal grazing and migration area for semi-nomadic herders.

Oral traditions trace the permanent settlement of Kh. al-Halawa to families from Yatta in the early 20th century, who adapted existing caves and stone structures for habitation. In the British Mandate period, residents relied on a combination of animal husbandry, dryland farming, and seasonal grazing.

Halawa appears in early 20th-century surveys as one of the settled extensions of Yatta in the South Hebron Hills. Residents gradually expanded into stone houses near their fields and pastures. Archaeological surveys note water cisterns and agricultural installations in the area, supporting claims of long-term habitation. Today, Halawa is among the villages threatened with demolition due to its location inside a firing zone.

== Legal-administrative context ==
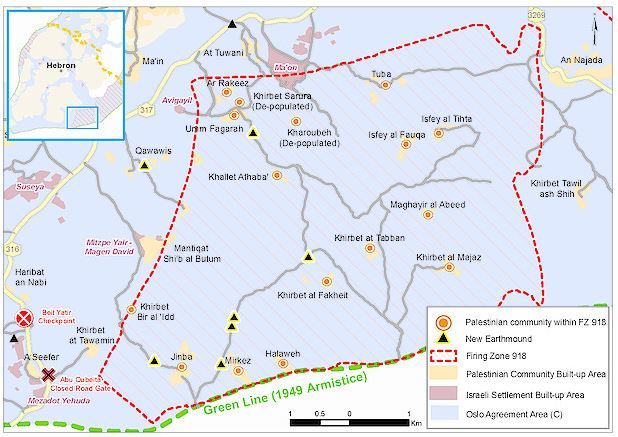
Administrative map of the area

Residents of Khirbet al-Halawa continue to inhabit caves, a legacy of displacement and military restrictions, despite possessing family land titles dating back generations. They describe being prevented from constructing homes or accessing basic services such as water, electricity, schools or roads, despite long-standing agricultural use, under the pretext of residing in a “military zone.”” Indeed, since the 1970s, Khirbet al-Halawa has been included in Israel's declared Firing Zone 918, a closed military zone covering much of Masafer Yatta. In May 2022, the Israeli Supreme Court upheld eviction orders for eight hamlets within the zone, placing over 2,000 residents, including those of Khirbet al-Halawa, at risk of forcible transfer.

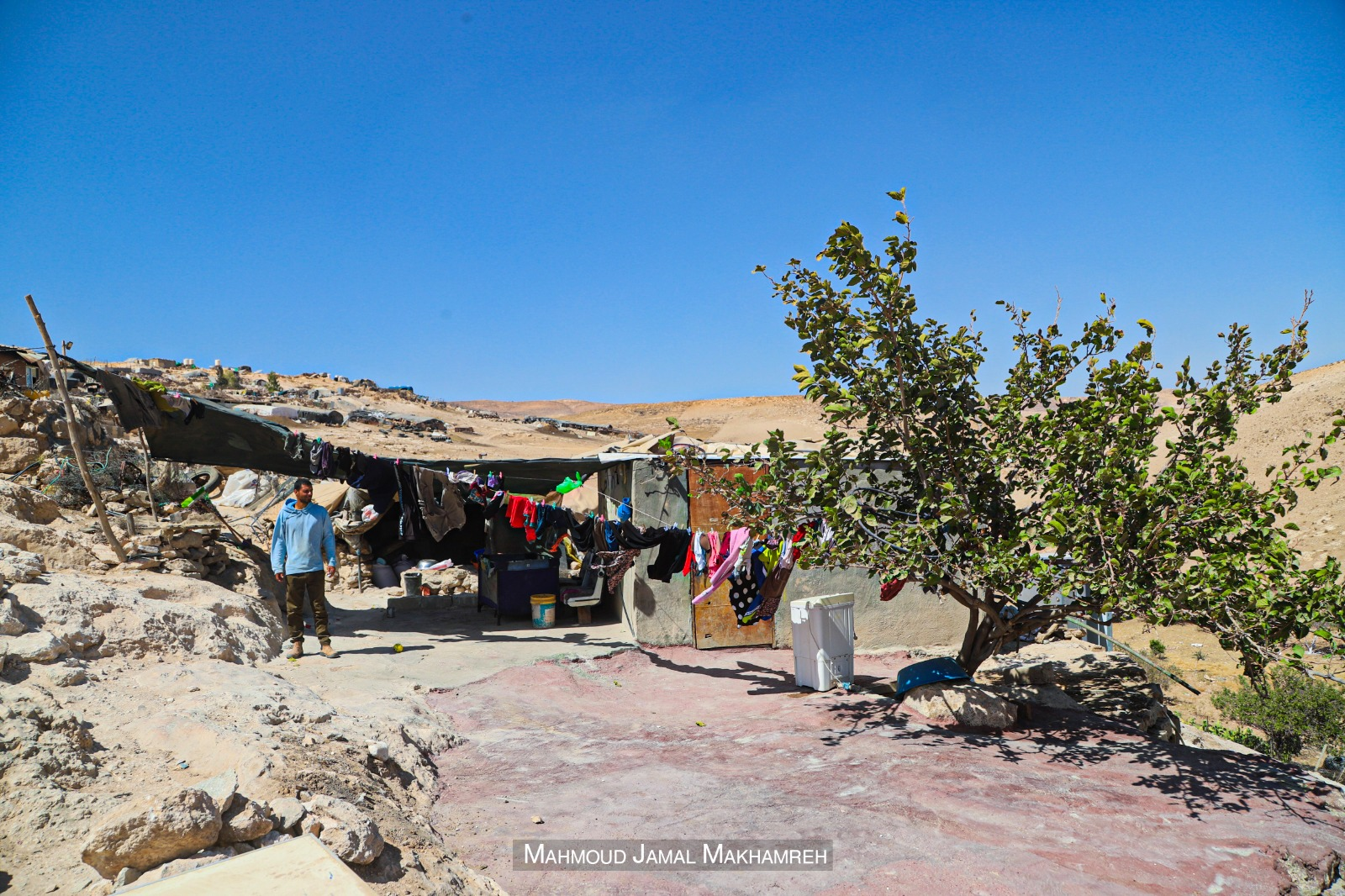
Khirbat al-Halawa

The village's stone houses, tents, and cisterns have been repeatedly subjected to demolition orders. Residents depend heavily on rainwater collection and solar power due to restrictions on infrastructure connection. Independent human rights groups have described the policy as ethnic cleansing.

== Population and livelihoods ==
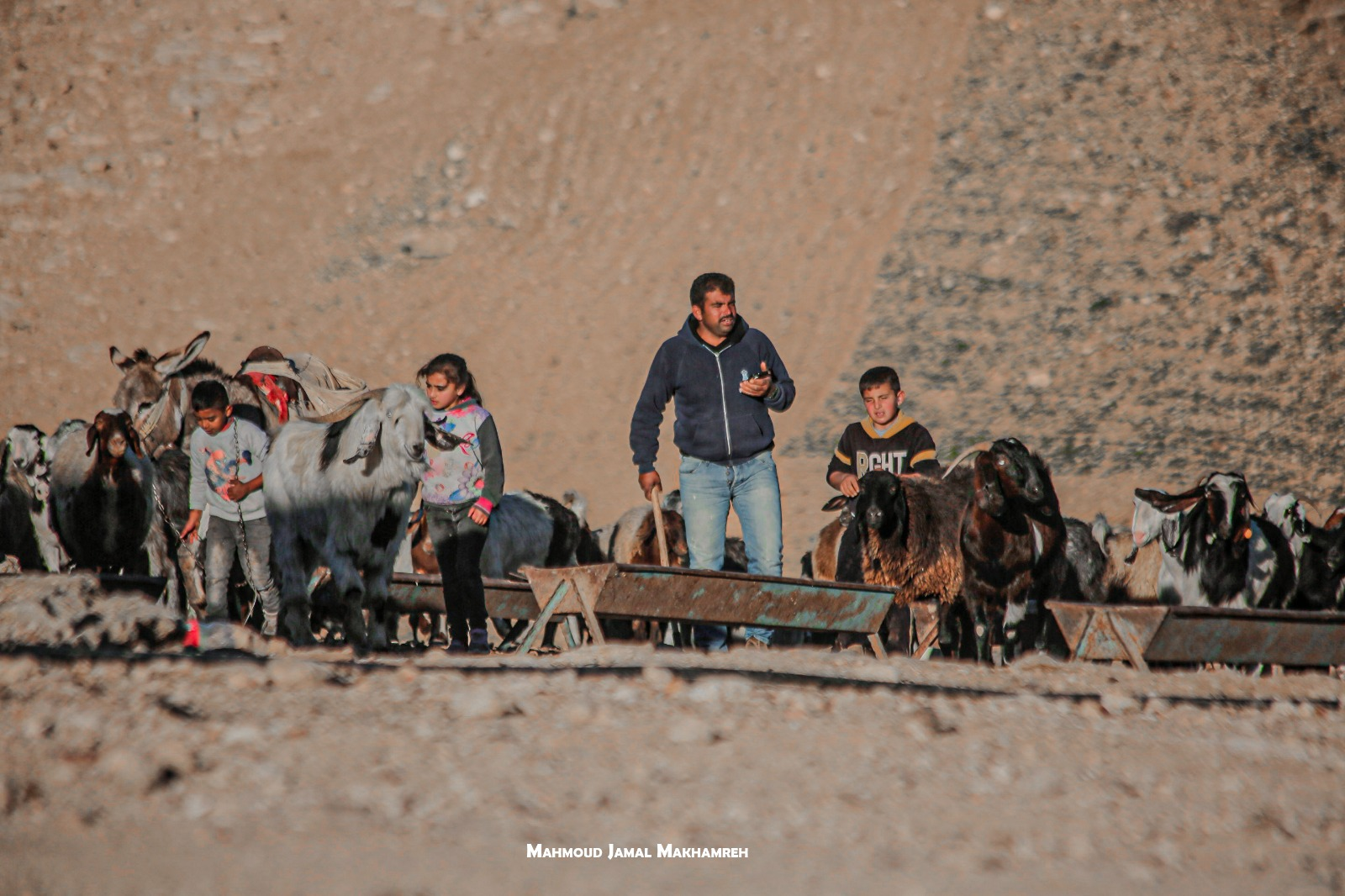
Al-Halawa village, Masafer Yatta, shepherds and their flock

Khirbet al-Halawa's population is estimated between 120 and 250 residents in recent years. As in other parts of Masafer Yatta, water is supplied mostly by tanker, while electricity is provided through solar panels maintained by local and NGO initiatives.

== See also ==
- Masafer Yatta
- Israeli settlement
- Israeli settler violence
