= Natan Shalem =

Israeli geographer, geologist and researcher

Natan Shalem נתן שלם
- Born: October 10, 1897; Salonica, Ottoman Empire
- Died: 1959 (aged 61–62); Israel
- Awards: the settlement of Mitzpe Shalem is named after him
- Scientific career
- Fields: Geography, Geology

Natan Shalem (Hebrew: נתן שלם; October 10, 1897 - 1959) was an Israeli geographer, geologist and researcher.

== Biography ==
Shalem was born in Thessaloniki to a traditional Jewish family. Growing up, Shalem studied at various Jewish educational institutes.

In 1914 Shalem immigrated to Ottoman Palestine.

During the First World War Shalem began to teach in the moshava Sejera.

In 1919 Shalem went to study geology in Florence where he obtained his doctorate in 1924.

=== Teaching in Jerusalem ===
After getting his doctorate Shalem returned to Palestine and settled in Jerusalem, where he worked as a teacher for geography, chemistry and physics at the Gymnasia Rehavia. Within this framework, Shalem took part in many local nature trips through the years together with his students. Shalem was among the founders of the Land of Israel Wandering Association (אגודת משוטטים ארץ-ישראלית) together with his friend David Benvenisti. Shalem conducted various observations and measurements during the outings and collected samples of local rocks, fossils and plants. Shalem studied mainly the Judean Desert in particular.

=== Academic activity ===
Shalem wrote many scientific papers following his observations, which were collected in two books.

Every summer, Shalem travelled to Florence to keep up with the latest discoveries in geology and geography, and he took part in various scientific conferences. During the mid-thirties Shalem took part in a year of advanced training in geography at the University of London.

In 1953, after the Establishment of the State of Israel, Shalem became a member of staff at the Geological Institute of Israel where he engaged in seismology and established the Geophysical Institute of Israel (המכון הגיאופיזי של מדינת ישראל).

== Commemoration ==
The settlement of Mitzpe Shalem in the Judean Desert was named after him. (The name was suggested by Shalem's former student Rehavam Ze'evi). In addition, various streets in several cities in Israel are named after him.
