= Topaz Luk =

Spokesperson for Prime Minister of Israel, Benjamin Netanyahu

- טופז לוק
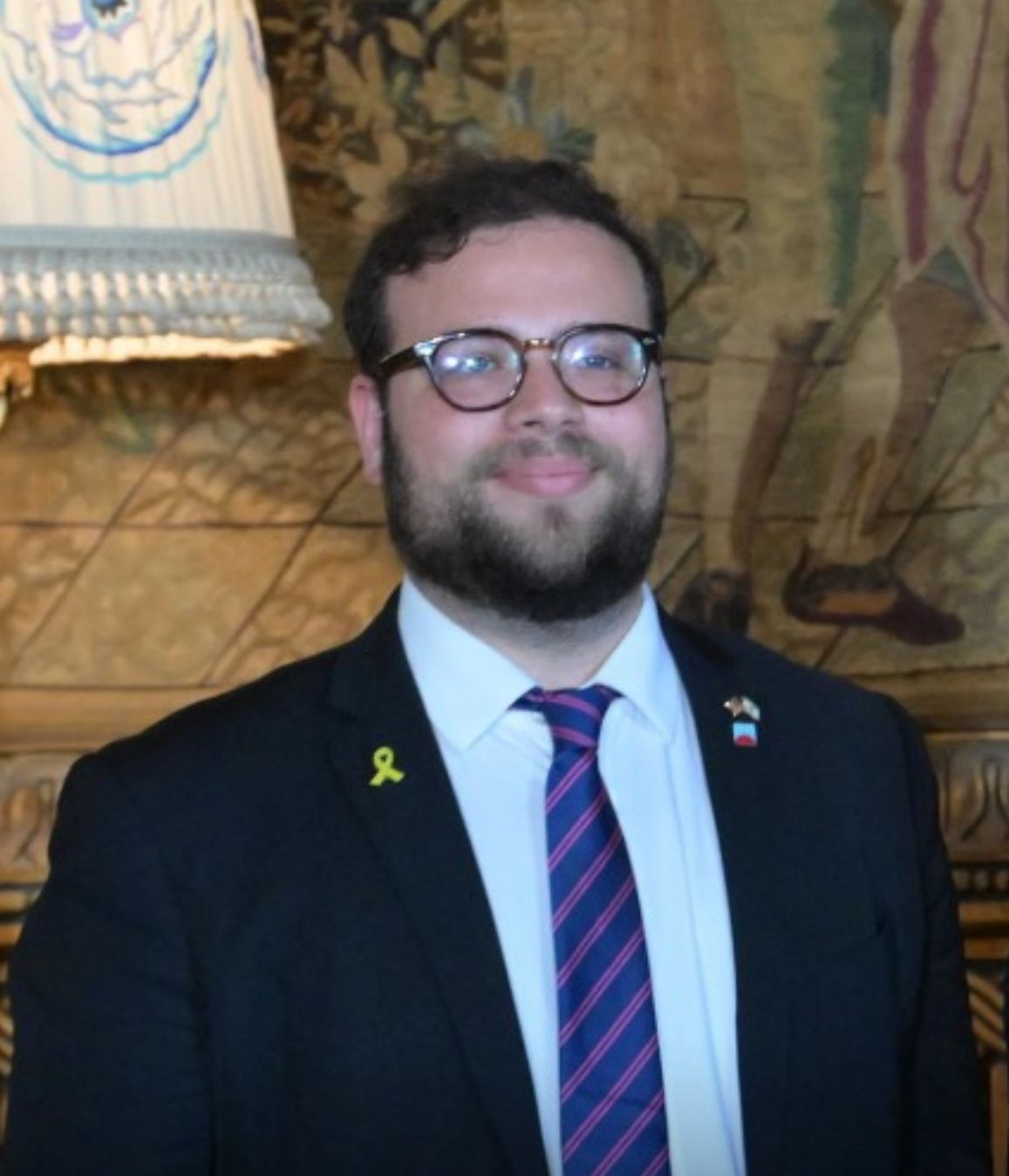
- Born: April 26, 1992 (age 34); Ashkelon, Israel
- Occupation: media
- Years active: 2014 - Present

Topaz Luk (Hebrew: טופז לוק; born April 26, 1992) is in Israeli media consultant. He served as the spokesperson and the media consultant for Prime Minister of Israel, Benjamin Netanyahu. He currently serves as a senior consultant to Netanyahu on behalf of the Likud Party and head of the party's external relations.

== Biography ==
Luk was born and raised in Ashkelon, where he attended Nof Yam A Elementary School and Kfar Silver High School.

He began his career in the IDF Spokesperson's Unit, where he was one of the founders of the IDF's social media network and specialized in social media. He served in the unit along with Jonatan Urich and Yair Netanyahu.

In 2014, at the age of 22, following Yair Netanyahu's recommendation to his father, Topaz began working as the new media manager for then-Prime Minister Benjamin Netanyahu. Since then, Luk has been considered one of the closest associates to Netanyahu and his family.

Topaz Luk served as Netanyahu's new media advisor, managing communication strategies on social networks and participating in numerous political campaigns. His work is considered a significant factor in shaping Netanyahu's public image and his ability to reach wide audiences through social media. Over the years, Luk transitioned to various roles, and in 2023 he was appointed as the Prime Minister's spokesperson at the Prime Minister's Office.

In 2022, during the formation of the government in the twenty-fifth Knesset, it was estimated that he would serve as the head of the National Public Diplomacy Directorate. Eventually, he served as an acting head until the appointment of Moshik Aviv.

As of 2024, Topaz Luk serves as a senior advisor to Netanyahu within the Likud party, responsible for the party's foreign relations. He has moved to a behind-the-scenes role and continues to influence the policies and strategies of the Prime Minister and the party.

== Criticism ==
During the COVID-19 pandemic, Luk was fined for violating quarantine regulations after being seen filming protests against Netanyahu while he was supposed to be in isolation. Luk claimed he had gone out for a medical check-up and did not intend to break the guidelines.

In the 2015 election campaign, Netanyahu used the phrase "the Arabs are heading to the polls" to encourage his supporters to vote. This statement sparked public outrage and sharp criticism for using racial fear-mongering to gain a political advantage. Topaz Luk was involved in this campaign.

== Achievements ==
2019 - Topaz Luk was ranked 29th on The Marker's list of the 100 most influential people, due to his significant contribution to communication and new media for the Prime Minister.

2019 - He was selected for Maariv newspaper's list of the 100 most influential people.

2021 - He was named one of the 40 promising young individuals by Ice Magazine, recognizing the leading young professionals in their fields in Israel.
