= Lior Haiat =

Israeli diplomat

- ליאור חייט
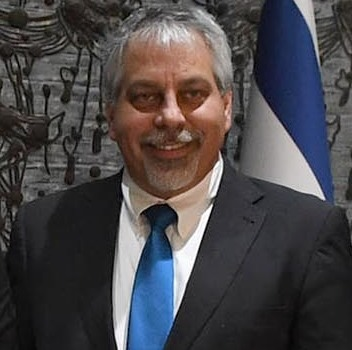

Head of the National Public Diplomacy Directorate
- In office March 2022 – December 2022
- Preceded by: Elad Tene
- Succeeded by: Moshik Aviv

Personal details
- Citizenship: Israel
- Children: 3
- Education: Tel Aviv University
- Occupation: Diplomat, Spokesman and civil servant

Lior Haiat (Hebrew: ליאור חייט) is an Israeli diplomat and a spokesperson. He serves as the deputy director of the Ministry of Foreign Affairs and head of the North America Division. He is the former head of the National Strategic communications directorate and the media advisor to the prime minister, spokesman of the Ministry of Foreign Affairs and Consul General of Israel in Miami.

== Career ==
Haiat was born and raised in Petah Tikva. He completed his military service as an artillery coordination officer in the infantry, and was discharged with the rank of captain. During the term of the twenty-eighth government of Israel, he served as the spokesman and parliamentary assistant of Knesset member David Tal. He began his work in the Israeli Foreign Service in 2001. His first position was spokesman and cultural attaché at the Israeli embassy in Argentina.

Upon his return to Israel in 2007, he was appointed Deputy Spokesman for the Ministry of Foreign Affairs, and in 2009 he began his position as the Spokesman for the Israeli Embassy in Spain. In 2014, he was appointed head of the Mexico, Central America and Caribbean department, a position he held for about two years before he was sent to serve as Israel's consul general in Miami.

In 2019, he replaced Emmanuel Nahshon as spokesman for the Ministry of Foreign Affairs. During his tenure, the Abraham Accords were signed and the Negev Summit was held. In this position, he broke a world record for giving interviews to international media when he was interviewed for 15 consecutive hours (and about 100 interviews) on the subject of normalization between Israel and Arab countries. In July 2022, with the appointment of Yair Lapid as Prime Minister of Israel, Haiat was appointed head of the National Strategic Communications Directorate and a media advisor to the prime minister, and is the first diplomat to hold this position. A few days after taking office, he led the communications efforts during the visit of the President of the United States, Joe Biden, to Israel. After the establishment of the thirty-seventh government of Israel, he resigned and returned to the Ministry of Foreign Affairs. In April 2024, he finished his term as spokesman for the Ministry of Foreign Affairs and was appointed deputy director of the Ministry of Foreign Affairs and head of the North American Division.

== Education and personal life ==
Haiat has a bachelor's degree in communications and economics from Tel Aviv University and a master's degree in public policy from the Hebrew University in Jerusalem . He speaks Hebrew, English, Spanish and Portuguese. He is married to Hani and is the father of three children.

In 2023, Haiat participated on the Israeli version of The Chase, and won the trivia race on the show.
