= Kochav =

Kochav or Kochav (Hebrew: כוכב, lit. 'star') may be a Jewish given name and a surname. Notable people with tyhe name include:

- Cochav Elkayam-Levy, Israeli legal scholar and human rights advocate
- Dor Kochav, Israeli footballer
- Ran Kochav, Israeli military officer
