= Effie Defrin =

Israeli military officer

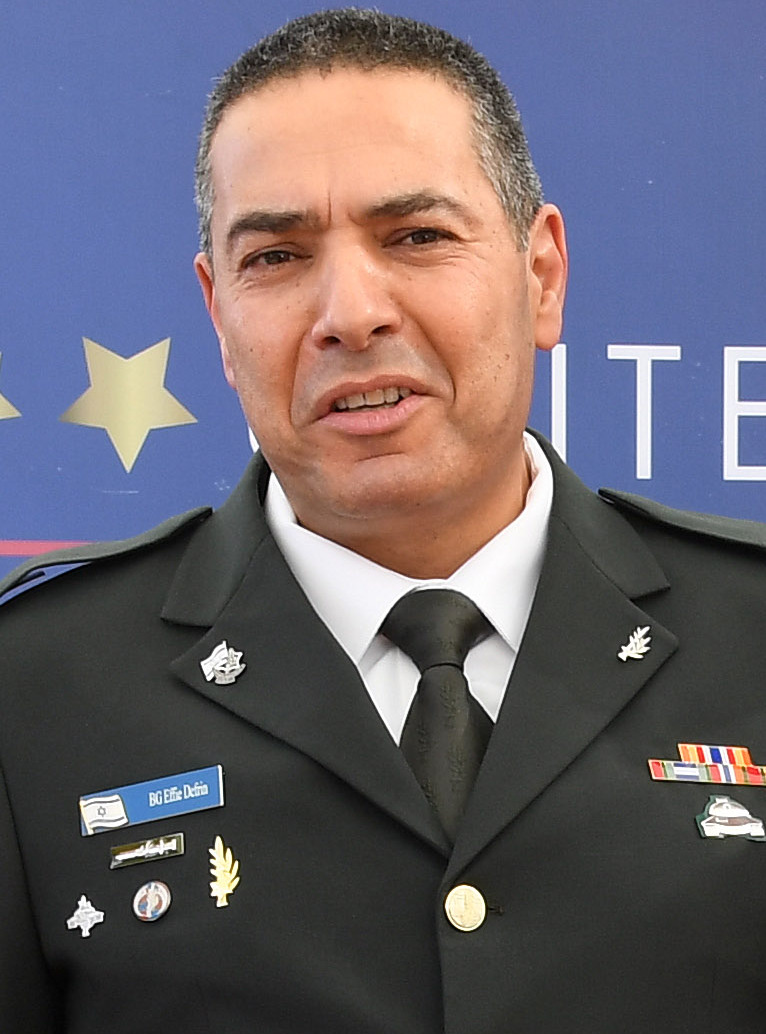
- Nickname: "Effi"
- Allegiance: Israel
- Branch: Israel Defense Forces
- Rank: Brigadier general

Ephraim "Effi" Defrin is an Israel Defense Forces officer and the current IDF spokesperson since 27 March 2025, having succeeded Daniel Hagari. His previous position was head of the Tevel Division. He has also served as deputy commander of Ga'ash Formation and commander of 27th Brigade.

== Early life and education ==
Ephraim Defrin was born in Giv'at Olga. His father Baruch immigrated from Romania, and his mother Aliza from Morocco. In his youth, he attended a vocational school.

== Career ==
Upon enlistment, he joined the 7th Armored Brigade, completing combat and tank commanders’ training. He then completed an officer's course and served as a tank platoon commander. In 1997, he became a company commander in the 75th Battalion, 7th Brigade.

In the 2006 Lebanon War, he commanded the 9th Battalion of the 401st Brigade during the Battle of Wadi Saluki, where he was severely wounded. After several weeks of recovery, he returned to command his battalion.

Later, he commanded the 532nd Battalion in the 460th Brigade and served as operations officer (G3) of the 162nd Division. After completing the Brigade Commanders Course, he was appointed commander of the 27th Brigade. Upon the brigade's dissolution, in 2014 he was appointed deputy commander of Ga'ash Formation, serving until 2015. On 12 September 2016 he was appointed as IDF attaché to India.

Defrin was promoted to brigadier general and became head of the Foreign Relations Division within the Planning Directorate, continuing after it was restructured under the Strategy and Third Circle Directorate as the Tevel Division. He retired from the IDF in August 2024 after 33 years of service.

He served as VP Marketing at Rafael Advanced Defense Systems.

On 9 March 2025, IDF Chief of Staff Eyal Zamir appointed him as the IDF Spokesperson. On 27 March 2025 he entered office officially. During the June 2025 Israeli strikes against Iran, at Defrin's request, Hagari returned as acting director of the Spokesperson's Unit to lead internal operations, while Defrin remained as the public face of the unit. Hagari was expected to remain in the position until the conflict had ended.
