= Miri Regev =

Israeli politician (born 1965)

- מירי רגב
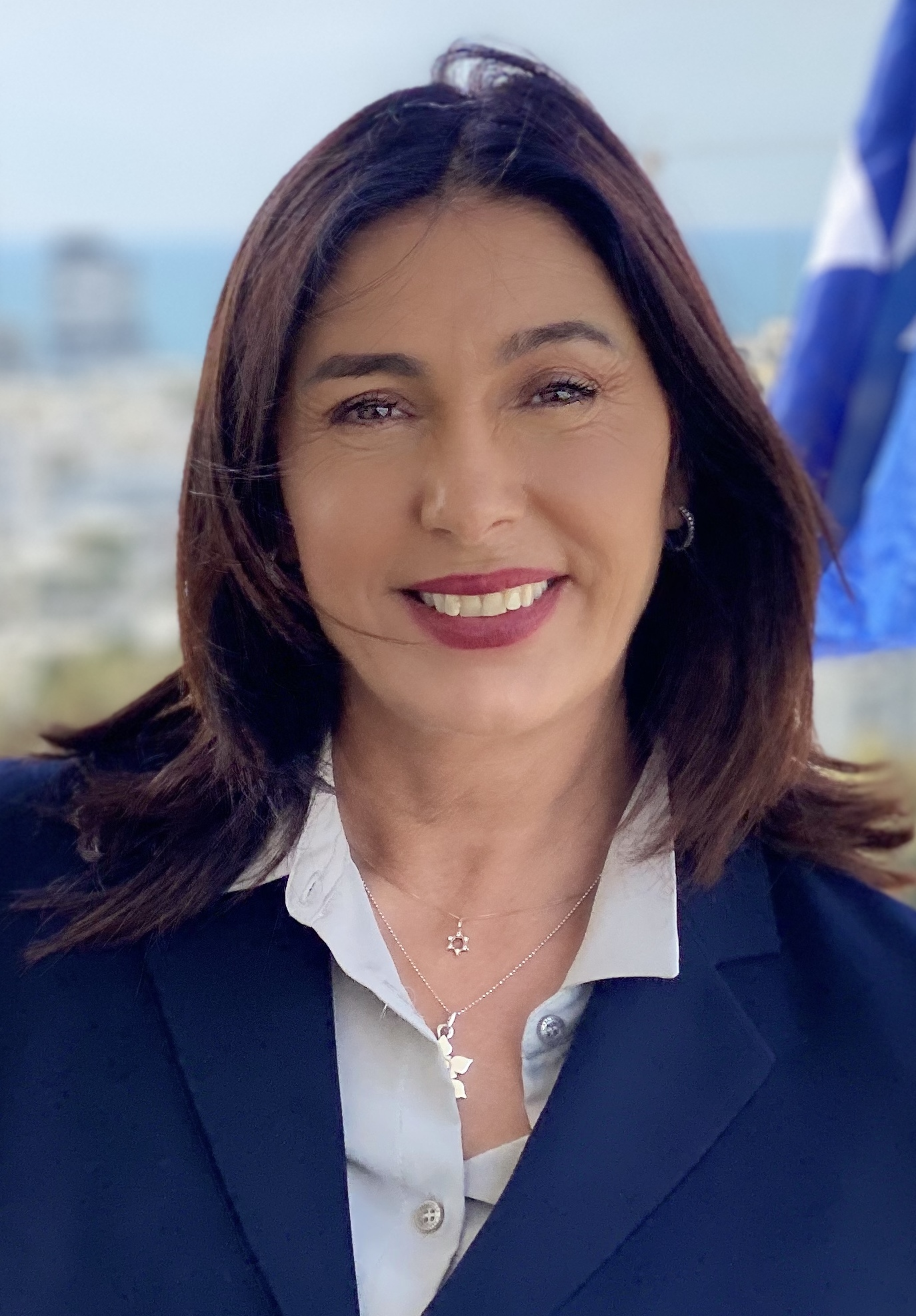
- Miri Regev in 2020

Ministerial roles
- 2015–2020: Minister of Culture and Sport
- 2020–2021: Minister of Transportation
- 2022–: Minister of Transportation and Road Safety

Faction represented in the Knesset
- 2009–: Likud

Personal details
- Born: Miriam Siboni; 26 May 1965 (age 61) Kiryat Gat, Israel
- Party: Likud (since 2008)
- Spouse: Dror Regev
- Children: 3
- Education: Beit Berl College; Ono Academic College
- Military career
- Allegiance: Israel
- Branch: Israel Defense Forces
- Service years: 1983–2008
- Rank: Tat aluf (Brigadier general)
- Units: Israeli Military Censor; IDF Spokesperson's Unit
- Conflicts: Second Lebanon War
- Awards: Outstanding Presidential of Israel Award for Soldiers

Miriam "Miri" Regev (Hebrew: מרים "מירי" רגב; born 26 May 1965) is an Israeli politician who currently serves as Minister of Transport, National Infrastructure and Road Safety. Previously she was Minister of Culture and Sport and Acting Prime Minister of Israel. She entered politics following an extensive military career. In her last military post, she was a brigadier-general in the Israel Defense Forces and served as the IDF Spokeswoman.

== Biography ==
Miriam Siboni (later Miri Regev) was born in Kiryat Gat to Sephardi Jewish immigrants. She attended Rogozin High School in Kiryat Gat. Her father, Felix, was from Morocco and her mother, Mercedes, was from Spain. In 1983, she joined the Gadna, where she became a platoon commander, serving in the position until 1986. She earned a bachelor's degree in Informal Education from The Beit Berl academic college, and an MBA from Ono Academic College. She is married to Dror Regev, an engineer at Israel Aerospace Industries and has three children. Her husband is from a left-wing background and holds some views opposing her own.

Revital Madar, a Tunisian-Israeli writer for Haaretz, stated that Regev had faced discrimination due to her Moroccan origins, and her forthright behaviour is perceived as being stereotypically Mizrahi.

== Public relations career ==
She began serving as the IDF Spokesperson's representative in the Israeli Southern Command. Regev was promoted to a colonel rank for the position of Deputy IDF Spokesperson in 2002. In 2003, she was appointed coordinator of the national public relations efforts at the Israeli Prime Minister's Office in preparation for the Iraq War. After a short stint (2004–2005) as the Chief Press and Media Censor, she was promoted to the rank of brigadier general and to the position of IDF Spokesperson in 2005. She served in this position during Israel's disengagement from Gaza in 2005 and the 2006 Lebanon War. In 2007, she was discharged and was succeeded by Avi Benayahu.

== Political career ==
In November 2008, Regev joined the Likud party, saying that she had been a supporter of the party's platform for many years. She won twenty-seventh place on the party's list for the 2009 elections, just high enough to enter the Knesset as Likud won 27 seats. At the 2015 elections Regev was re-elected, after being placed fifth on Likud's national list. She was subsequently appointed by Prime Minister Benjamin Netanyahu as Minister of Culture and Sport in the new government.

=== Minister of Culture ===
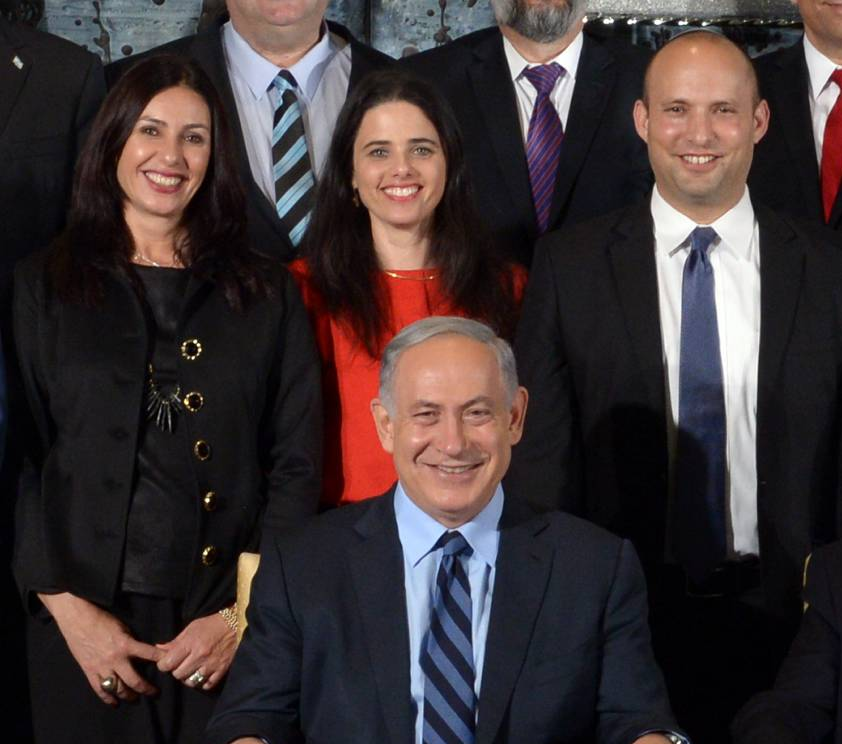
Miri Regev (left) alongside Prime Minister Benjamin Netanyahu, Ayelet Shaked (center) and Naftali Bennett (right)

In September 2015, four months in office, Regev announced a list of criteria that will cause the withdrawal of state funding the following year. The list included the deformation of state symbols and a call for boycotting Israel.

In July 2016, Regev announced that she would not participate in the 2016 Summer Olympics opening ceremonies, because they take place on Shabbat.

In her position as Minister of Culture, Regev frequently equated artistic Freedom of Expression with the power of the government to withdraw its funding, using the term "Freedom of Funding". Regev also argued that state-funded artists or organisations must show "loyalty" to the Israeli state. She has called this a "Loyalty in Culture" initiative, and has proposed legislation making "support for a cultural institution dependent on its loyalty to the state of Israel". She has said the group Breaking the Silence "hurts Israel's image" and accused a gallery that had hosted a talk by the group of "holding political activities". Regev said in 2016 that she made an agreement with Prime Minister Benjamin Netanyahu to create a new, “nostalgic” radio station for veteran artists deserving recognition. This statement was made a day after the death of Israeli veteran singer Gabi Shoshan.

=== Ministry of Transport, National Infrastructure and Road Safety ===
In May 2020, Regev was offered the portfolio of Ministry of Transport, National Infrastructure and Road Safety for the first half of the 35th government of Israel and the portfolio of foreign minister during the second half of the incoming government's term. She was sworn in to this position on 17 May 2020. She was replaced by Merav Michaeli following the formation of the thirty-sixth government of Israel on 14 June 2021.

On 29 December 2022, Regev was appointed to the position for a second time by Benjamin Netanyahu during the formation of the thirty-seventh government of Israel.

In May 2024, Channel 13 aired a report where the former Ministry of Transport chief of professional staff accused Regev of politicising the Ministry, giving preferential treatment to localities with higher levels of Likud support and to Likud activists. In early June 2024, the Lahav 433 unit of the Israel Police raided the Ministry's offices as part of an investigation into corruption following the Channel 13 report.

=== Likud leadership bid ===
On 14 August 2021, Regev announced ger intention to run for the leadership of Likud if and when Netanyahu steps down. Stressing her Sephardi background, she stated "The time has come to have a Sephardi prime minister, I think the Likud rank and file must vote this time for someone who represents their class, their ethnicity and their agenda." She also made it clear that if she does not become leader of Likud, she may form a new party.

== Political views and positions ==
Gregg Carlstrom of The Atlantic described Regev in 2016 as "an acrimonious populist, who occasionally draws comparisons to Donald Trump."

In May 2012, at a demonstration against illegal immigrants in Tel Aviv, Regev said that "Sudanese infiltrators are a cancer in the nation's body". She later said that the quote was misrepresented, and, while justifying the comparison, apologized for seeming to compare human beings to cancer. In a 2012 interview, in response to criticism alleging that her views were totalitarian, Regev said that she was "happy to be a fascist". In 2016, fellow Likud legislator Gila Gamliel called comments by Regev advocating for state control over the content of a public broadcasting company "borderline fascist". Benjamin Netanyahu has defended Regev from charges of fascism, stating that "'there was a tendency within the left to denigrate opponents as fascist'. (Note: Quoting the Encyclopedia Hebraica entry on fascism) It is a derogatory name [used] by the left for its enemies."

Regev met with LGBT members of her party, saying that "not only the left can support and embrace the gay community". In November 2018, Regev expressed support for a law that would allow surrogacy for same-sex male couples in Israel, stating that the coalition's decision to vote against the law was wrong and emphasized the right of LGBT individuals to be parents and raise children.

Regev participated in the Israeli nationalist Dance of Flags march in May 2023. In July 2024, after the Israeli military police visited Sde Teiman detention camp to detain nine Israeli soldiers suspected of abuse of a Palestinian prisoner, Regev commented that arrests of Israeli soldiers were "dangerous" during war, and warned against military prosecutions that were "appeasing our enemies".

In 2025, Regev denied the Gaza Strip Famine, stating "There is no famine. There is no humanitarian disaster. And according to the hostages' testimonies – there are also no innocents or uninvolved people [in Gaza]."

In September 2026, Regev delivered pre-recorded remarks at a conference for the far-right Patriots for Europe group, organized by Freedom Party of Austria politician Harald Vilimsky.
