= Noam Shapira =

- נעם שפירא

Director of Israel's National Public Diplomacy Staff
- Incumbent
- Assumed office June 2026

Noam Shapira (Hebrew: נעם שפירא) is an Israeli military officer, serving as Director of Israel's National Public Diplomacy Staff within the National Public Diplomacy Directorate since June 2026.

== Career ==
Shapira previously in the IDF General Staff Reconnaissance Unit and as a commander in the IDF Operations Directorate.

Shapira commanded the unit that created the Telegram channel "72 Virgins - Uncensored", which allegedly carried out an influence operation directed towards Israelis following the October 7 attacks, including publishing graphic wartime footage and crude messaging in Hebrew.

=== National Public Diplomacy Directorate ===
In June 2026, Shapira was appointed Director of Israel's National Public Diplomacy Staff. The position had previously been vacant since January 2023.
