= Doron Spielman =

- דורון שפילמן

International Spokesperson for the National Public Diplomacy Directorate at the Israeli Prime Minister’s Office
- Incumbent
- Assumed office 1 July 2026
- Prime Minister: Benjamin Netanyahu
- Preceded by: position established

Doron Spielman (Hebrew: דורון שפילמן) is an American-born Israeli military officer and New York Times bestselling author serving as international spokesperson for the National Public Diplomacy Directorate in the Prime Minister's Office since July 2026.

== Early life and education ==
Spielman was born in the United States, and attended the University of Michigan, studying international relations and middle eastern studies. He graduated from the Churchill National Security Program. He immigrated to Israel in January 2000.

== Career ==
Spielman previously served as the founder and CEO of Spielman Dynamics, a strategic communications and media consulting firm. From 2000 to 2023, he served as vice president of the City of David Foundation.

Spielman is a reserve major in the Israel Defense Forces (IDF). He previously served as a spokesperson to foreign media in the IDF Spokesperson's Unit during the Gaza War.

=== National Public Diplomacy Directorate ===
Spielman was appointed to the newly established National Public Diplomacy Directorate on July 1, 2026.

Following his appointment to the National Public Diplomacy Directorate, Spielman expressed concerns with Donald Trump's proposed Hamas disarmament deal, saying that "Our assessment is that if we redeploy before Hamas is truly disarmed, it will quickly expand its presence throughout Gaza, rebuild its terrorist infrastructure, once again threaten Israeli communities, and seek to carry out another Oct. 7-style attack."

Following the premiere of the documentary NAZA, Spielman described the movie as "a targeted attack on the State of Israel".

== Publications ==
In 2025, Spielman published When the Stones Speak: The Remarkable Discovery of the City of David and What Israel’s Enemies Don’t Want You To Know, including evidence that Jews are indigenous to Jerusalem and the Land of Israel. The book become a New York Times bestseller. In December 2025, the book was presented by US Ambassador Mike Huckabee at an event titled "Will the fate of the Western Civilization be decided in the City of David?".
