= Moti Almoz =

Israeli general

- מוטי אלמוז
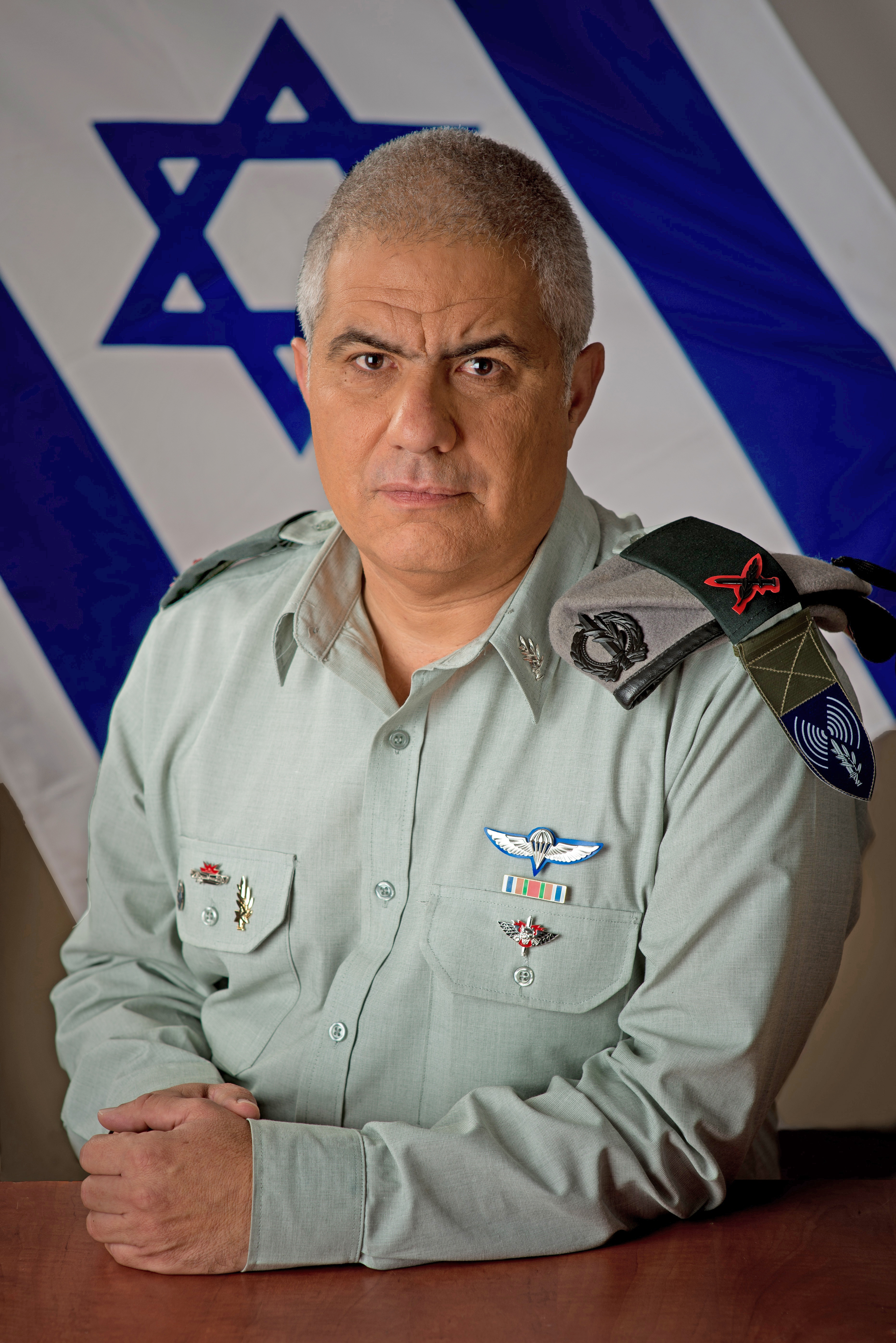
- Born: 1967 (age 58–59) moshav Migdal, Israel
- Military career
- Allegiance: Israel
- Rank: Aluf (Major General)
- Commands: IDF Spokesperson, Combat Engineering Corps, Israeli Civil Administration

Mordechai (Moti) Almoz (Hebrew: מוטי אלמוז; born 1967) is a major general ("Aluf") in the Israel Defense Forces who has been serving as the IDF Spokesperson since 2013. He previously served as commander of the Combat Engineering Corps and head of the Israeli Civil Administration.

== Biography ==
Almoz was born and raised on moshav Migdal. In 1985 he joined the IDF Engineering Corps, becoming an officer. In 1998 he was appointed commander of Battalion 605. In 2002 he was appointed an officer of the Southern Command. In 2004 Almoz served as the Jordan Valley Brigade Commander during Operation Bringing Home the Goods. In 2007 he was promoted to brigadier general and appointed head of the Central Command headquarters. In November 2010, Almoz was appointed head of the Civil Administration in the West Bank.

In April 2013, Defense Minister Moshe Ya'alon appointed Almoz as IDF Spokesperson, replacing Yoav Mordechai. Almoz took office in October 2013.

Almoz holds a bachelor's degree in Middle Eastern studies and a master's degree in military and security from the Hebrew University of Jerusalem. He is married with five children.
