= IDF Spokesperson's Unit =

Israeli military unit

- דובר צה"ל
- Active: 1948–present
- Country: Israel
- Allegiance: Israel Defense Forces

The IDF Spokesperson's Unit (Hebrew: דובר צה"ל, Dover Tzahal, abbr. Dotz) is the unit in the Operations Directorate of the Israel Defense Forces (IDF), responsible for information policy and media relations. The unit is led by the IDF Spokesperson, a brigadier general and member of the General Staff, and by the Deputy Spokesperson, a colonel. Since March 2025 and as of June 2025 the spokesperson is Effie Defrin.

The International Media Branch of the unit is responsible for the administration of IDF communications with international media outlets, and for shaping the image of the IDF in the foreign public arena.

== Mission ==
The unit is also a key player in the public diplomacy efforts of the State of Israel. The 2015 IDF military doctrine highlights the strategic importance of using the power of the media; economic, legal, media, and political aspects are considered as part of the military approach as much as military combat.

Since 2008, the IDF has increasingly also invested in a strong presence on the most important social media platforms. In the meantime, the English-speaking Facebook page of the IDF is one of the most followed social media representations of armies worldwide.

== Structure and people ==
The unit has become the largest spokesperson unit in Israel.

=== IDF spokesperson ===
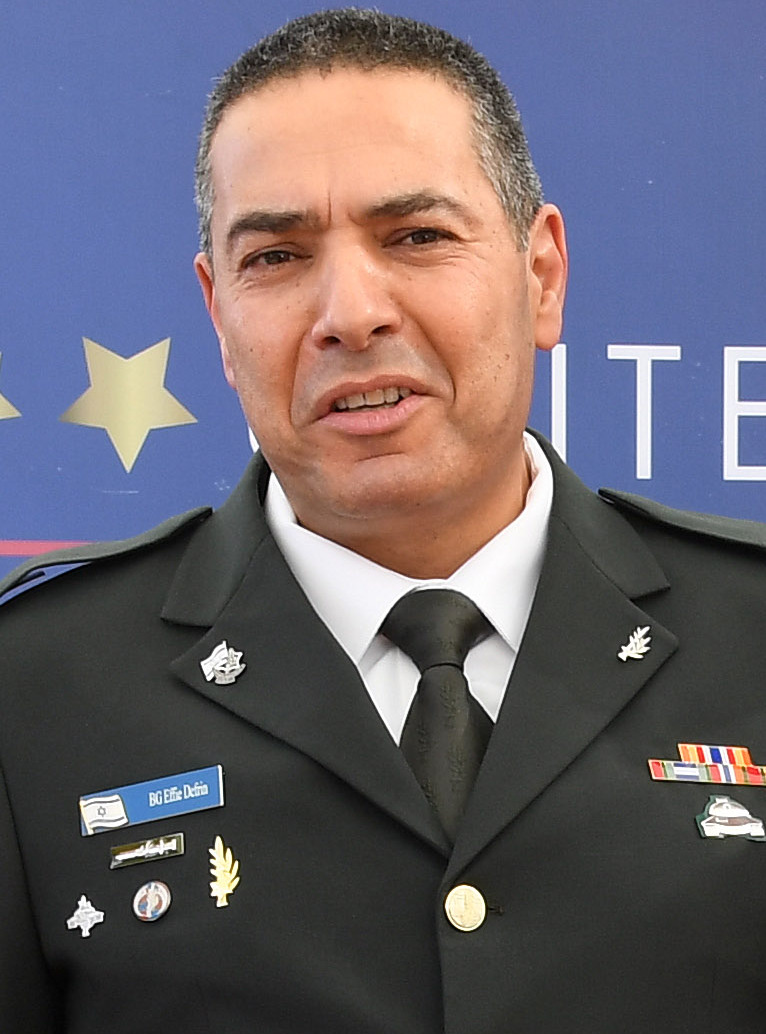
IDF Spokesperson since March 2025, Effie Defrin

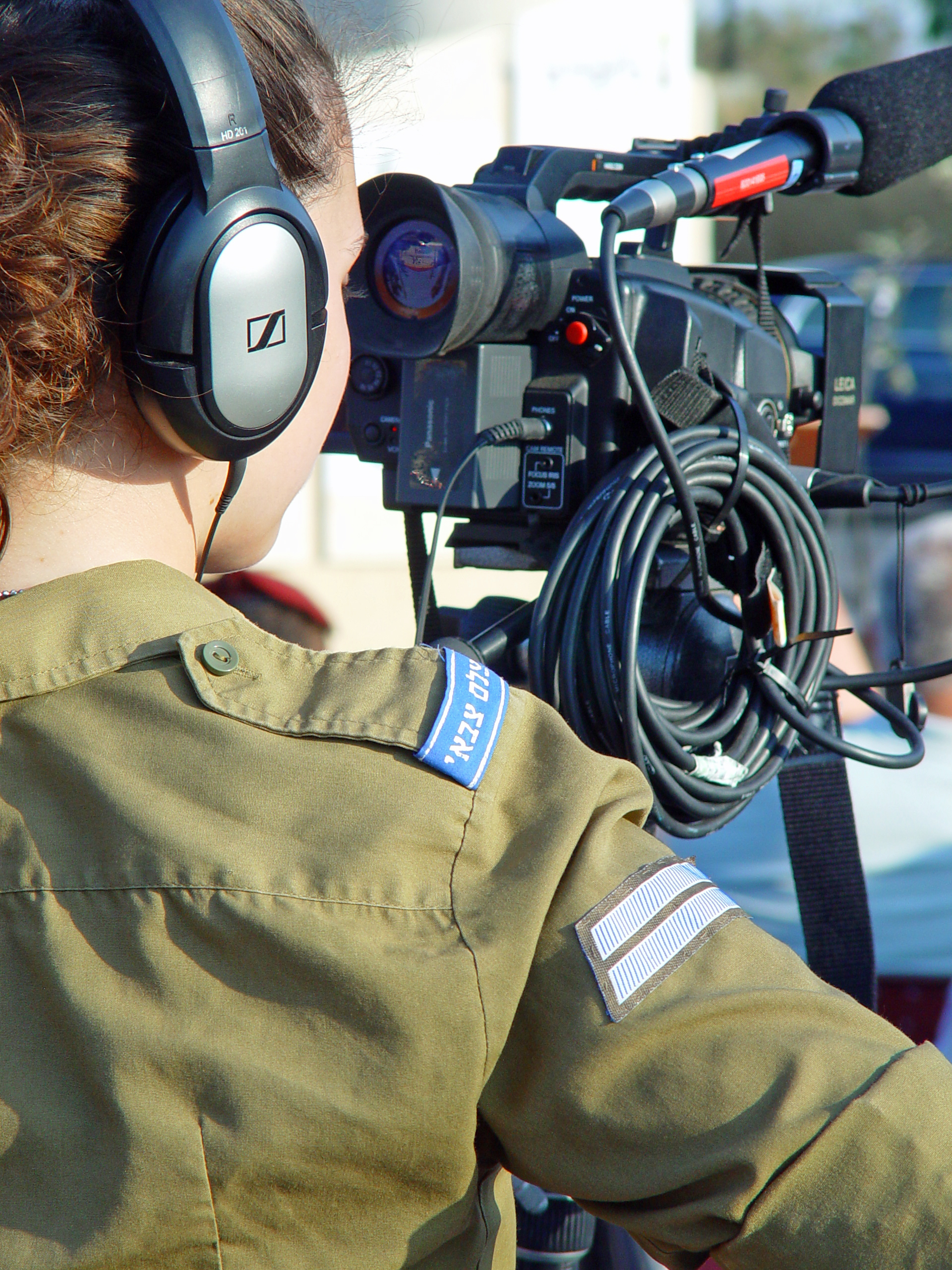
IDF Spokesperson's Unit military photographer

The IDF spokesperson holds the rank of Tat Aluf (Brigadier General) and is subordinate to the Chief of the Operations Branch, who holds the rank of Aluf (Major General). The spokesperson is a member of the IDF General Staff Forum. Daniel Hagari, replaced former spokesperson Ran Kochav in March 2023.

On 27 March 2025, Effie Defrin assumed the role of spokesperson, two days after Hagari's departure. During the June 2025 Israeli strikes against Iran, at Effrin's request, Hagari returned as acting director of the Spokesperson's Unit to lead internal operations, while Defrin remained as the public face of the unit. Hagari was expected to remain in the position until the conflict had ended.

=== Israeli Communication Branch ===
The Israeli Communication Branch is responsible for liaising with all media outlets in Israel. It operates in both routine and emergency situations to promote specific topics on the public agenda and in media discourse, as well as to strengthen trust in the IDF. Previously, this branch was known as the "Press Liaison Unit" and later as the "Press Liaison Branch." The soldiers in this branch are divided into sections, each responsible for communication with reporters from various media outlets:

- Military Reporters Section: Soldiers work with the military reporters' guild in Israel, comprising dozens of journalists and commentators focused on IDF coverage. They accompany background briefings, work on prearranged articles on various military topics, and respond to media inquiries. This section is staffed at all times, providing responses around the clock, especially during operational events.
- Television and Productions Section: This section manages the relationship between the IDF and all television networks. The work is divided between interactions with daytime show producers, main news broadcasts, and long-term television productions.
- Print Media Section: Manages the IDF’s interactions with all nationwide newspaper systems. This involves working with editors, system coordinators, commentators, and various reporters in fields such as regional news, health, economy, aviation, technology, and more. It also includes the Haredi Media Cell, which liaises between the IDF and Haredi media across various platforms.
- Economic Section: This section handles communications with economic reporters and serves as a knowledge source for the entire branch. It also manages the public relations for the Military Advocate General's Unit and its head, Brigadier General Professor Gil Pinchas.
- Internet and Radio Section (Interadio): Responsible for maintaining relations between the IDF and online and radio media systems.
- Army-Society Section: Engages in direct public relations efforts with opinion leaders in Israel, including public appearances by military officials at conferences, participation in meetings with Israeli elites, and visits by opinion leaders to IDF installations.
- Local Media Section: Coordinates work with local media targeting specific geographic audiences, such as the Yedioth Ahronoth network of local newspapers. It also collaborates with regional radio stations.
- Internal Communication Section: Responsible for internal IDF publications, initiating articles on the IDF website, and other related websites.
- Reporting Operations Room: Handles the public relations for operational events that occurred in the last 24 hours in the IDF and military sectors to the Israeli media.

=== International Media Branch ===
The International Media Branch is responsible for the administration of IDF communications with international media outlets. Through its different desks – the News Desk; North American Desk; European Desk; Latin American and Asian Desk; Arabic Language Desk; and Russian Language Desk – the Foreign Press Branch fields requests and inquiries from foreign news media. In June 2009 a New Media Desk was established in order to deal with the growing interest from bloggers and various social media networks. From then onwards there was a marked increase in the IDF Spokesperson Unit's online presence, through such venues as an official blog, a YouTube account, and a Twitter feed. As of 2015, the IDF was active on 30 different social media platforms. In 2017, the branch had 15 staff members responsible for taking care of the social media platforms used by the IDF to reach out to audiences abroad.

In mid-2015, Lt. Col. Peter Lerner was appointed spokesperson to international media and commander of IDF social media activities. He was born in London and attended Sinai School in Kenton, before his family moved to Israel when he was 12. The Jewish Telegraphic Agency ranked him fifth among its most influential people on "Jewish Twitter" in March 2016, and in the following November, Jewish News ranked him 18th on its "Aliyah 100" list of "those who have made a significant contribution to the State of Israel". After presiding over a staff of 70, he retired from the IDF in April 2019, to become Director General of a new International Division of Israel's General Federation of Labour, the Histadrut.

After Lerner's retirement, Lt. Col. Richard Hecht became head of the International Media Branch. Hecht grew up in the Glasgow suburb of Newton Mearns, in Scotland, and moved to Israel with his family in the 1980s. Hecht is co-author, with Richard Friedland, of the 2000 work To Rule Jerusalem. A former member of the Israeli Air Force, in both combat and foreign affairs roles, he had retired, but was called back in to IMB in November 2022.

During the Gaza war that followed the attack by Hamas on Israel on 7 October 2023, Lerner returned to the IDF and joined Hecht in the IMB. He does daytime interviews, and Hecht does briefings with groups of journalists using Zoom.

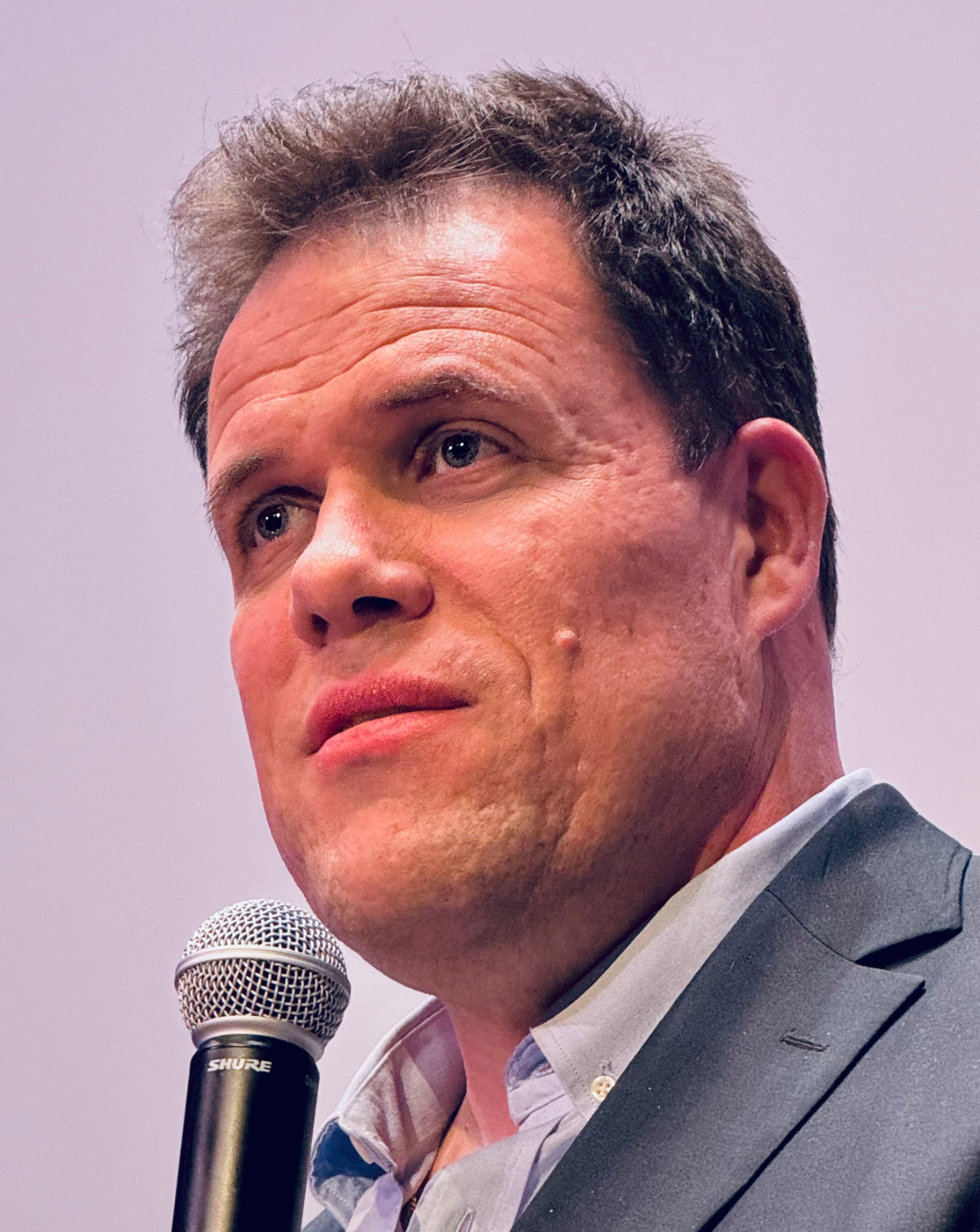
Jonathan Conricus

Former combat commander, and 24-year IDF veteran, Lt. Col. (ret.) Jonathan Conricus was the international spokesperson of the IDF from 2017 to 2021. In the wake of the 2023 Hamas attack he returned and gave overnight briefings and interviews. Conricus was born in Israel, and lived in Malmö, Sweden, as a child, until his family returned to Israel when he was 13. He was the first Israeli officer to be seconded to the United Nations, where as an Assessment Officer he provided strategic analysis for United Nations peacekeeping forces. After serving in the IDF for 24 years, he became a reserve officer. As he is on the (Israeli time) overnight shift, he focuses on American media.

The current head of the branch is Lt. Col. Nadav Shoshani, who took up his post in April 2024. Other English-speaking staff include Maj. Roni Caplan, Maj. Libby Weiss, Maj. Arieh, Lt.-Col. Amnon Shefler, and Maj. Doron Spielman.

== Leaders ==
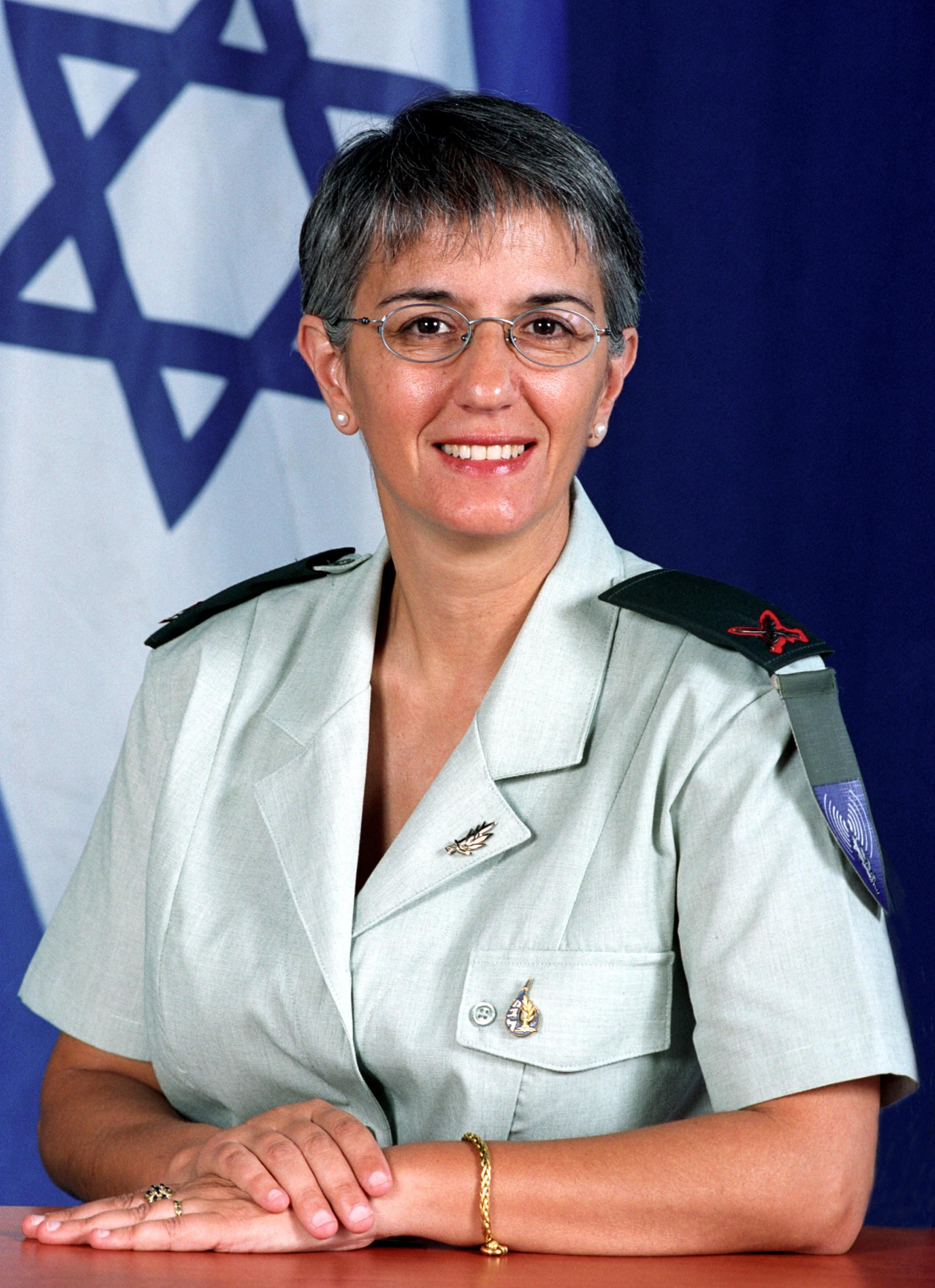
Ruth Yaron

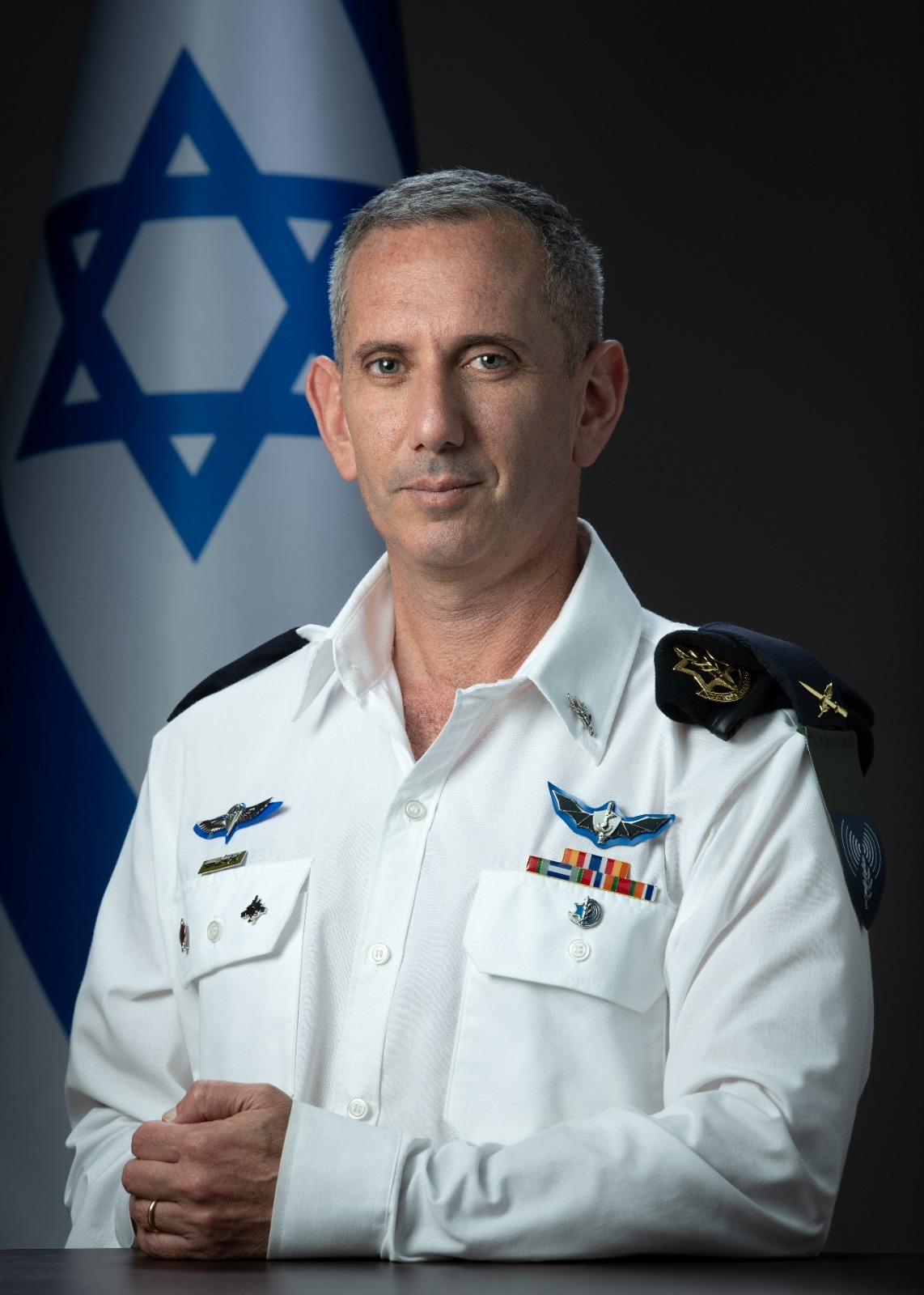
IDF Spokesperson March 2023 - March 2025, Daniel Hagari

- 1948–1952: Lt. Col. Moshe Pearlman
- 1952–1953: Lt. Col. Aminadav Fry
- 1953–1955: Col. Nahman Karni
- 1955–1957: Col. Nehemiah Brosh
- 1957–1959: Lt. Col. Shaul Ramati
- 1959–1963: Lt. Col. Dov Sinai
- 1963–1967: Col. Aryeh Shalev
- 1967–1969: Col. Rafael Efrat
- 1969–1973: Col. Yossi Calev
- 1973–1974: Brig. Gen. Pinhas Lahav
- 1974–1975: Brig. Gen. Efraim Poran
- 1975–1976: Brig. Gen. Dov Sion
- 1976–1977: Brig. Gen. Yoel Ben Porat
- 1977–1979: Col. Yitzhak Golan
- 1979–1984: Brig. Gen. Ya'akov Even
- 1984–1989: Brig. Gen. Efraim Lapid
- 1989–1991: Brig. Gen. Nachman Shai
- 1991–1994: Brig. Gen. Eilan Tal
- 1994–1996: Brig. Gen. Amos Gilad
- 1996–1999: Brig. Gen. Oded Ben Ami
- 2000–2002: Brig. Gen. Ron Kitri
- 2002–2005: Brig. Gen. Ruth Yaron (first woman to lead unit)
- 2005–2007: Brig. Gen. Miri Regev
- 2007–2011: Brig. Gen. Avi Benayahu
- 2011–2013: Brig. Gen. Yoav Mordechai
- 2013–2017: Brig. Gen. Moti Almoz
- 2017–2019: Brig. Gen. Ronen Manelis
- 2019–2021: Brig. Gen: Hidai Zilberman
- 2021–2023: Brig. Gen: Ran Kochav
- 2023–2025: Brig. Gen: Daniel Hagari
- 2026–present: Brig. Gen: Effie Defrin

== See also ==
- Public diplomacy of Israel
- Israel Defense Forces
