= National Public Diplomacy Directorate =

National Public Diplomacy Directorate at the Israeli Prime Minister’s Office
- מערך ההסברה הלאומי

Agency overview
- Agency executives: Tzipi Hotovely, Head of National Public Diplomacy; Noam Shapira, Director of National Public Diplomacy Staff; Doron Spielman, International Spokesperson for the Directorate
- Parent department: Prime Minister's Office

The National Public Diplomacy Directorate at the Israeli Prime Minister’s Office (Hebrew: מערך ההסברה הלאומי), also known as the National Information Directorate or National Hasbara Directorate is an Israeli government agency responsible for public diplomacy, and coordinating official messaging across the IDF Spokesperson's Unit, Mossad, police, Shin Bet, and other agencies.

The current Head of National Public Diplomacy is Tzipi Hotovely, serving since May 2026.

== Background ==
Israeli public diplomacy is known in Hebrew as hasbara (Hebrew: הַסְבָּרָה). Within the Israeli Prime Minister's Office, Hasbara is conducted by the National Public Diplomacy Directorate and the Government Press Office.

== History ==
The agency was without a permanent head from May 2024 to May 2026, following the resignation of Moshik Aviv.

Following the premier of the documentary film NAZA, the Directorate along with the Israel Defense Forces and Israeli Foreign Ministry announced they were preparing a campaign to rebut the film's claims.

In September 2026, the Directorate launched a public diplomacy effort in New York City through the Israel Government Advertising Agency involving 500 billboards to draw attention to "the threat posed by Iran’s terrorist regime", along with the US-Israel partnership in addressing it. The campaign coincided with the eighty-first session of the United Nations General Assembly.
