= Ran Kochav =

Israeli military officer

- רן כוכב
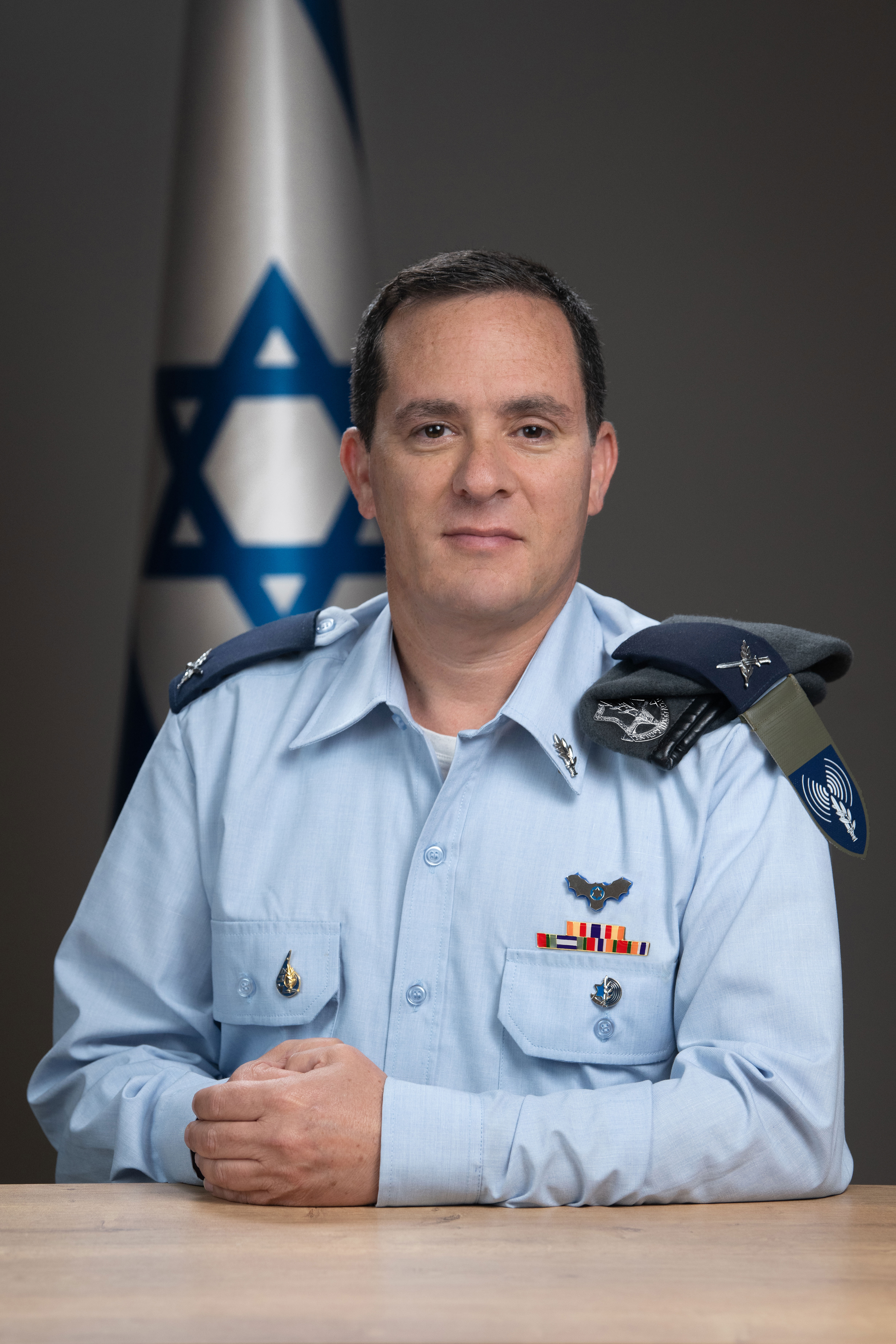
- Born: July 6, 1971 (age 55)
- Military career
- Allegiance: Israel
- Branch: Israel Defense Forces
- Service years: 1989–present
- Rank: Tat-Aluf (Brigadier General)
- Nickname: RanKo
- Unit: IDF Spokesperson's Unit
- Commands: 66th Battalion ("Ram"); Arrow Missiles 136th Battalion; 168th Air Wing; School and Academy of Air & Missile Defense; Military Police Corps; Air & Missile Defense Forces; IDF Spokesperson's Unit
- Conflicts: First Intifada; South Lebanon conflict (1985–2000); Second Intifada; Operation Defensive Shield; 2006 Lebanon War; Operation Cast Lead; Operation Pillar of Defense; Operation Brother's Keeper; Operation Protective Edge; Operation Northern Shield; Operation Breaking Dawn

Ran Kochav "RanKo" (Hebrew: "רן כוכב "רנכו; born July 6, 1971) is an Israel Defense Forces brigadier general (Tat-Aluf) who was the IDF Spokesperson, as the commander of the Israeli Air & Missile Defense Forces and as the chief general officer of the Military Police Corps.

== Military service ==
Kochav joined the IDF in 1989 and was a soldier and officer in the Israeli Air Force under Anti-Aircraft Command. During this time he commanded a mobile anti-aircraft battery (MIM-72 Chaparral). He was a deputy commander of the M61 Vulcan and FIM-92 Stinger battalion in the Israel's Northern border "Purple Line" of ceasefire when the IDF stayed in south Lebanon.

Kochav was a commander of a C2 in IAF during the 1997 Israeli helicopter disaster and led the rescue forces near the cemetery of Kibbutz Dafna. In the following years he was the operations officer of the Anti-Aircraft Command during the Second Gulf War and Operation Defensive Shield, in which the 66th battalion participated in the battles in the West Bank.

In 2003–2005 Kochav was the commander of the 66th battalion ("Ram"), a mobile anti-aircraft battery based on several weapons – Machbet, M61 Vulcan, and FIM-92 Stinger – in the northern border of Israel after the withdrawal of the IDF from Lebanon (2000). Before the 2006 Lebanon war he was the divisional anti-aircraft officer of the 91st division. He went on to be the head of the special forces section in the Air Group of IAF (2005-2006).

In 2006 Kochav was appointed the commander of the Arrow missiles 136th Battalion "Protective Sword", which he also commanded during the 2006 second Lebanon war. Upon his return from studies in the US (2008-2009) he was appointed as the head of TRADOC (Training and Doctrine) section of the anti-aircraft command. He led the operational evolution that brought the Anti-Aircraft Forces ("Nun-Mem") to its current structure as the Air and Missile Defense Command ("Hagna"), as well as the capabilities of Iron Dome batteries and making them operational until the first Iron Dome interceptions. As a commander of IAMD forces he was leading and responsibility protecting Israel from Palestinian rocket attacks on cities of Israel.

General Kochav became the first commander of the 168th air wing ("Defense of The State's Sky") upon the 2011 changes in the air and missile defense forces. Under his command served thousands of fighters and technicians who operated various air defense systems, including the American Patriot and Hawk systems.

From 2013 to 2015 he commanded the School and Academy of Air & Missile Defense, which trains and educates all air defense worriers and trains officers of all ranks. Then he went on to study at the Israeli National Security College. In 2016 he was promoted a Brigadier General and took office as the chief officer of the military police corps of IDF. He remained in this post until 2018, then returned to the Air Force and became the commander of the Israeli Air and Missile Forces, serving until April 2021.

In April 2021 he was appointed the IDF spokesperson. General Kochav was a member of the General Staff and directly subordinate to the chief of general staff, Lt. Gen. Aviv Kochavi, and his replacement, Lt. Gen. Herzi Halevi. During his tenure as IDF spokesperson operations took place in the West Bank, including "Breaking Waves" and an operation against Islamic Jihad at Gaza strip called "Breaking Dawn".

During this period, the IDF was also engaged in preventing Iranian entrenchment in Syria and in strategic cooperation with the United States of America and European countries.

In April 2023 he left office and was replaced by Daniel Hagari. As of 2023 General Kochav was a visiting fellow at the Royal United Services Institute (RUSI, United Kingdom) for Near East policy and a senior research fellow of air and missile defense.

== Decorations ==
Ran Kochav (RanKo) was awarded three campaign ribbons for his service during three wars.

Second Lebanon War	South Lebanon Security Zone	Operation Protective Edge

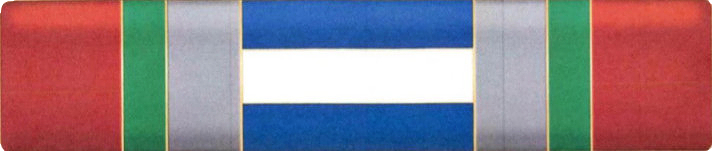

== Personal life ==
Kochav is married to Hila and has four sons, and resides in Caesarea. He earned his bachelor's degree in communications and business administration from the College of Management, Tel Aviv. He has two master's degrees: one in strategic studies from the Air University of the US Air Force in Montgomery, Alabama (Maxwell AFB), and another in political science from Haifa University and the Israeli National Security College.

== Links ==
- Ran Kochav on X
