= Michael Sobell Sinai School =

Sinai Jewish Primary School
- Sinai School
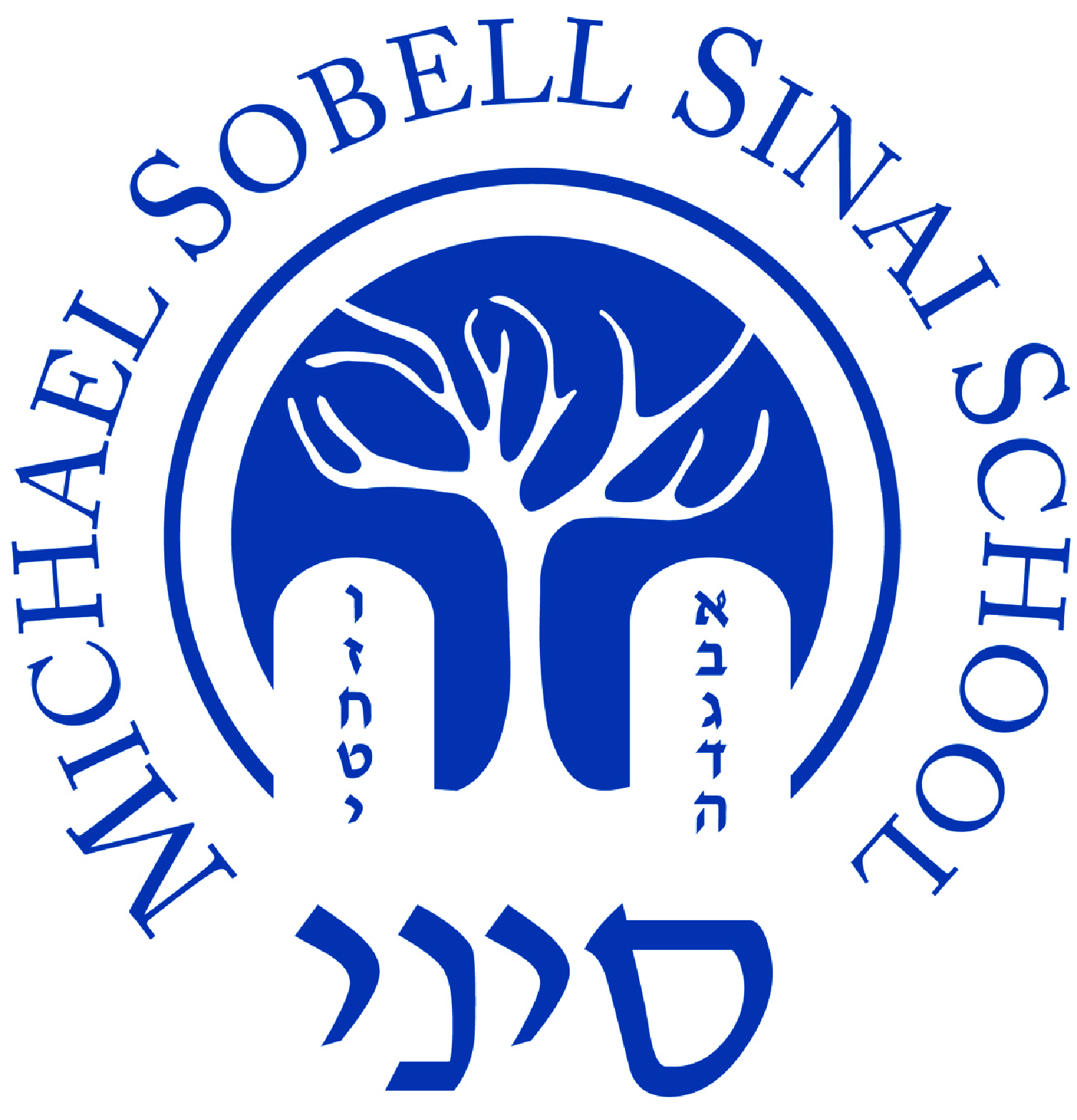
- The most vibrant Jewish School in London

Location
- Shakespeare Drive; Kenton, Brent; England; 51.5795°N 0.2821°W

Information
- Type: Voluntary aided school
- Religious affiliation: Jewish
- Local authority: London Borough of Brent
- Department for Education URN: 101549 Tables
- Chairman of Governors: Darren Simons
- Headteacher: Juliette Lipshaw
- Director of Jewish Studies: Rabbi Nicky Goldmeier
- Staff: 154
- Gender: Mixed
- Age: 3 to 11
- Capacity: 690
- Website: www.sinaischool.com

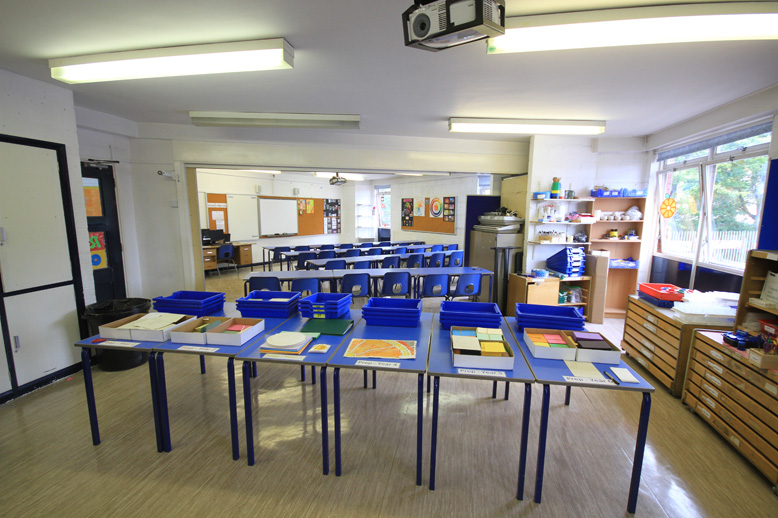
art room

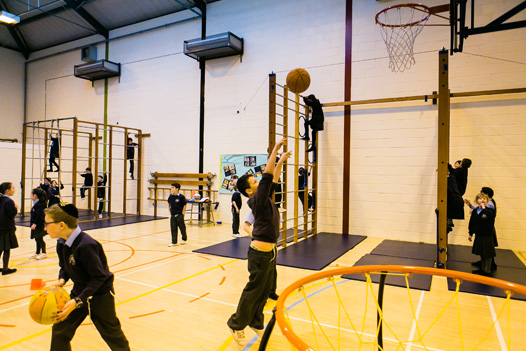
gymnasium

Sinai Jewish Primary School is a large three form entry voluntary aided modern orthodox Jewish primary school, under the auspices of the United Synagogue and is situated in Kenton in the London Borough of Brent. It is a co-educational primary school for up to 690 children aged 3–11. The school includes a nursery. It is the largest Jewish primary school in Europe. In addition to the name Michael Sobell Sinai School, the school is widely known and colloquially referred to as Sinai School.

== History ==
The Michael Sobell Sinai School began as the Bayswater Jewish School at 1 Westbourne Park Villas, St James's Terrace, Harrow Road, founded by members of the Bayswater Synagogue in 1866. It moved to a new building in Harrow Road in 1879, and by 1903 it educated 419 pupils.

In 1902, 222 of its pupils took part in the Paddington Children's Coronation Procession. In 1930, the school moved to Lancaster Road and changed its name to Kensington Bayswater Jewish School, which later became Solomon Wolfson.

The new Michael Sobell Sinai School (MSSS) opened in September 1981 with the pupils and staff coming from Solomon Wolfson and Yavneh schools to form the new nucleus of the school. In following years new facilities were added, including a gymnasium and a purpose-built block housing the school's nursery and reception classes.

In 2005, the school was chosen for one of the first national short Ofsted inspections.

On 25 September 2008, Michael Sobell Sinai School pupils interviewed the NASA astronaut Gregory Chamitoff through a live satellite link up while he was aboard the Space Shuttle.

== Ofsted ==
In January 2015, the school was inspected by Ofsted. The school was judged as Good in all five areas. The report states that this is a good school because;

- Senior leaders have high expectations and ambitions for the school. They are determined to do what is necessary to achieve the very best for all pupils.
- Leaders, including governors, make sure that the quality of teaching and pupil achievement continues to improve rapidly.
- Teachers enthuse their pupils to want to learn and achieve their best. Teaching secures good progress. In some year groups, pupils make outstanding progress in reading and writing.
- Pupils are articulate, mature and thoughtful learners. They behave well. The school keeps pupils exceptionally safe and secure.
- Disadvantaged pupils, disabled pupils and those with special educational needs make more progress than all other pupils.
- The early years provision is good. Children are happy, confident and inquisitive learners. Teaching meets the needs of all children. From their starting points, children make good progress in all areas of learning.
- The school's faith ethos promotes pupils’ spiritual, moral, social and cultural development exceptionally well. Pupils are proud to be Jewish. They also enjoy working with pupils from different ethnic and religious backgrounds. They are exceptionally well prepared for life in modern Britain.

The school was also commended by Sir Michael Wilshaw, head of Ofsted for its work with children from different ethnic and religious backgrounds. "Schools like Sinai Jewish Primary School in Brent, where inspectors found that pupils are “proud to be Jewish” but also “enjoy working with pupils from different ethnic and religious backgrounds”.

The school was previously inspected in March 2010, and was also graded as a Good school. The inspection report states that "This is a good school. The pupils enjoy school, feel safe and make a good contribution to the community. They are polite and effectively embrace the school's ethos of welcoming new pupils and visitors to the school".

== Pikuach ==
This inspection of the school was carried out under section 48 of the Education Act 2005 and in March 2010. The main findings of the report stated that "The quality of Jewish education at Michael Sobell Sinai School is good overall" and in the Early Years Foundation Stage, it is outstanding. Pupils are happy and they work hard. Parents are pleased with the school as evidenced from the parents’ questionnaires which were overwhelmingly positive." The report continues "Children in the Early Years Foundation Stage make outstanding progress. This is due to the outstanding quality of provision that ensures that they learn well both socially and academically in a safe and secure learning environment".

== Results ==
Sinai continues to produce high-level test results, and the majority of students achieve above-average levels in SATs. In 2013, the students earned a KS2 Average Point Score of 30.3, putting them on the higher end of all schools.

In 2013, the school came seventh in the Primary League Tables in Brent for its percentage of high-achieving pupils.

In 2013:

- The percentage of pupils attaining Level 4 or above in the Key Stage 2 Grammar, punctuation and spelling test was 87% which positioned it in the top 20% of all schools nationwide.
- The percentage of pupils attaining Level 4 or above in the Key Stage 2 in Writing was 94% which positioned it in the top 20% of all schools nationwide.

Progress Data shows that in 2013, 100% of pupils achieved expected progress in writing. This is an increase of five percentage points since 2012.

== Facilities ==
The school opened its doors on its current campus, which is located alongside JFS in September 1981. The school has expanded and now has three buildings for its pupils, including a separate Early Years Foundation Stage block, a full-size gymnasium and an Upper Key Stage 2 block. The school has undergone an intensive refurbishment programme in recent years and now has a dedicated art room, IT Hub and Computing Room, film studio and a large multiuse games area.

== Headteachers ==
- 1981: David Band (also head of Solomon Wolfson)
- 1990: Ian Lebens
- 1996: Vivienne Orloff
- 2012: Robert Leach
- 2017: Juliette Lipshaw
