= Ruth Yaron =

Israeli diplomat

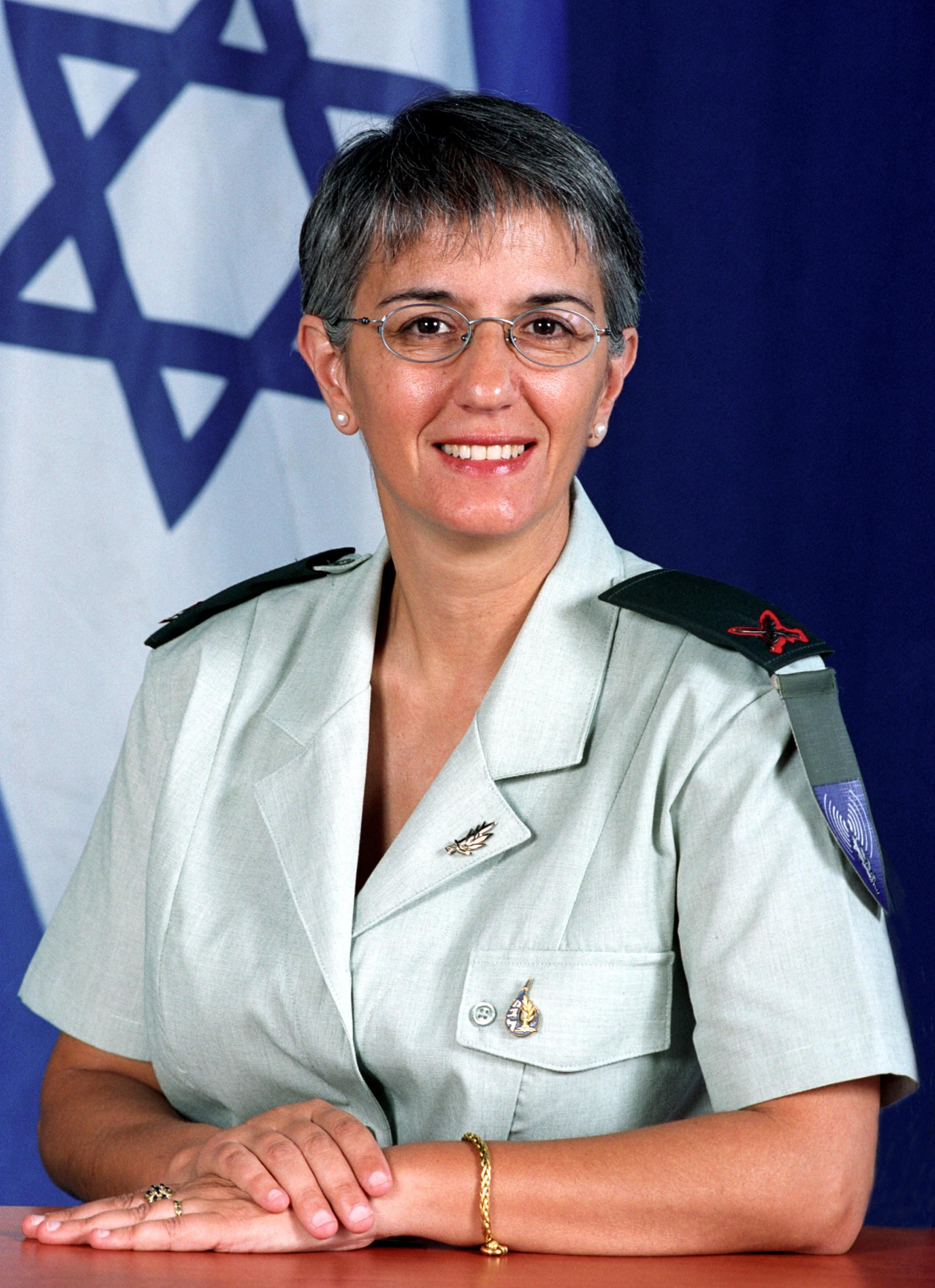
Ruth Yaron, July 2002

Ruth Yaron (Hebrew: רות ירון; born May 29, 1957, Constantine, Algeria) is a Senior diplomat in the Israeli Ministry of Foreign Affairs.

== Biography ==
Yaron emigrated to Israel with her family from Constantine, Algeria when she was four years old. They lived in Be'er Sheba where she attended the local schools. After serving in the military, she completed her B.A. in Political Science and International Relations at the Hebrew University. When she graduated, she completed the Ministry of Foreign Affairs' cadet course, and since then she has served as part of the Israeli diplomatic corp. Since then she earned a M.A. in Political Science and National Security from Haifa University, studied at the National Defense College and as of 2019, is studying for a Ph.D. in Political Science. She lives with her husband and two children in Modi'in.

== Career ==
From 1995 to 1997, Yaron was the head of the Jordanian department in the Ministry of Foreign Affairs. Her duties included handling Jordan-Israel relations. Specifically, she was charged with implementing the Peace Accord of which she participated in negotiations and signed a series of agreements with Jordan.

In 2002, she was named spokesperson for the Israeli Defense Forces (IDF) with the rank of brigadier general. As such, she was the first woman to be a member of the General Staff forum.
