= Moshik Aviv =

Israeli civil servant and former IDF officer

- מושיק אביב

Head of the National Public Diplomacy Directorate
- In office August 2023 – May 2024
- Preceded by: Lior Haiat
- Succeeded by: Tzipi Hotovely

Personal details
- Born: June 1, 1971 (age 55)

Moshik Aviv (מושיק אביב; Born on June 1, 1971) is an Israeli military officer who served as Head of the National Public Diplomacy Directorate from August 2023 to May 2024.

== Early career ==
Aviv led the education and social integration branch for two years and the culture department for four years. He then commanded the IDF Midrasha, the army's educational seminary, for three years.

He later spent eight years at the Ministry of Culture and Sport, where he ran its public diplomacy centre and organised state ceremonies.

== National Public Diplomacy Directorate ==
In August 2023 Prime Minister Benjamin Netanyahu appointed Aviv head of the National Public Diplomacy Directorate. The post had been empty since the government took office eight months earlier. Since October 2024 he has been director-general of Yad Labanim.

After the October 7 attacks, the directorate opened a command centre with a broadcast studio in Tel Aviv. By April 2024 its spokespeople had given more than 1,500 interviews from the studio. In March 2024 Aviv suspended English-language spokesman Eylon Levy, who later left the directorate.

Aviv resigned in May 2024, citing personal and medical reasons. Most of the directorate's staff left in the following weeks. The post stayed vacant until Tzipi Hotovely was appointed in April 2026.
