= Avi Benayahu =

Israeli general (born 1959)

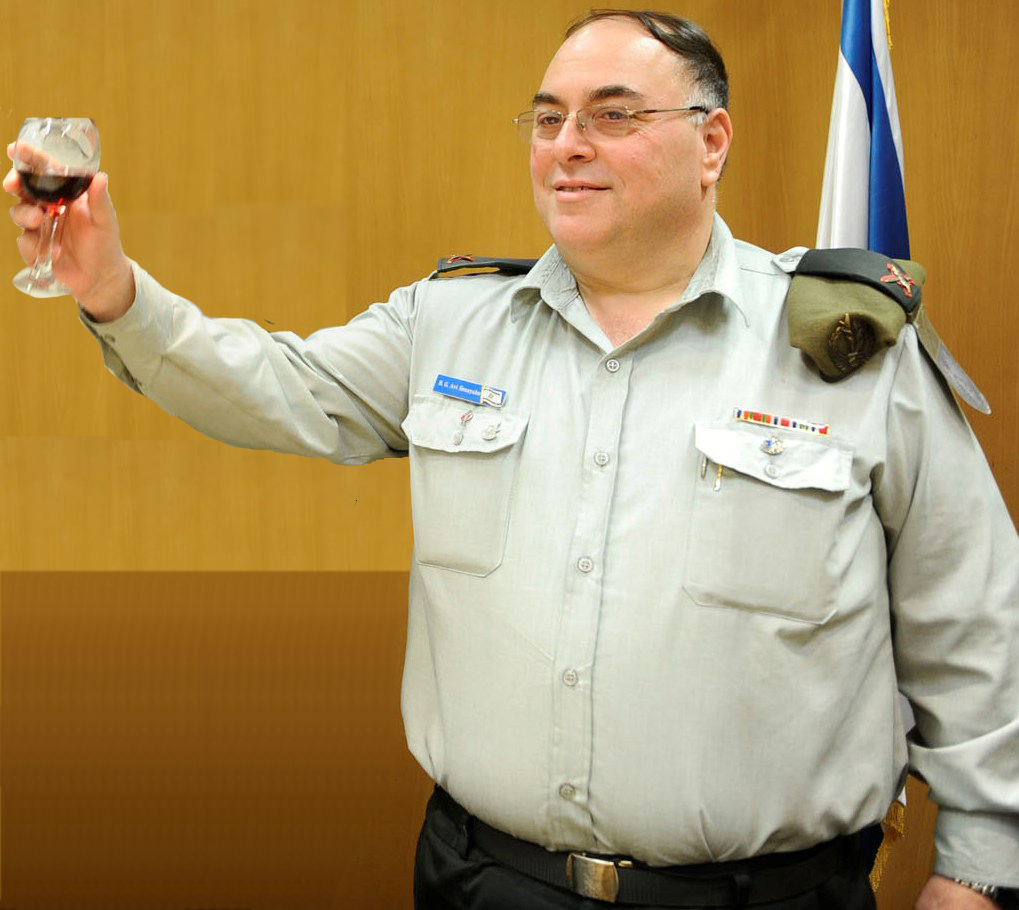
- Avi Benayahu
- Native name: אברהם בניהו
- Born: Avraham Benayahu; 1959 (age 66–67); Tel Aviv, Israel
- Allegiance: Israel
- Branch: Israel Defense Forces
- Service years: 1977–2011
- Rank: Brigadier general
- Commands: IDF Spokesperson's Unit

Avraham Benayahu (Hebrew: אברהם בניהו; born 1959), is an Israeli public figure, former military officer, and journalist. He is known for his role as a former spokesperson for the Israel Defense Forces (IDF) and his involvement in various media and public relations projects.

== Early life ==
Benayahu was born in Israel in the early 1960s. He grew up in a family that was closely connected to Israeli military and security services.

== Career ==
Benayahu's career began in the Israel Defense Forces, where he served in various capacities, ultimately becoming the official spokesperson for the IDF. As spokesperson, he was responsible for managing the military's public image and overseeing media relations, particularly during times of conflict. His role included issuing statements, holding press conferences, and providing the Israeli military's perspective on various incidents. Benayahu's leadership in the IDF's public relations efforts was noted during several high-profile military operations.

Benayahu also worked in the media sector. He transitioned into journalism, serving as an editor, columnist, and media consultant. He contributed to various Israeli newspapers and magazines, offering insights into military affairs and public communication. He was often invited to provide expert commentary on security and military matters in the media.

Benayahu has also been involved in various initiatives aimed at improving communication between the Israeli military and the global public. His expertise in crisis communication and media strategy was utilized in several instances of international scrutiny of Israel's military operations.
