= Daniel Hagari =

Israeli military officer (born 1976)

- דניאל הגרי
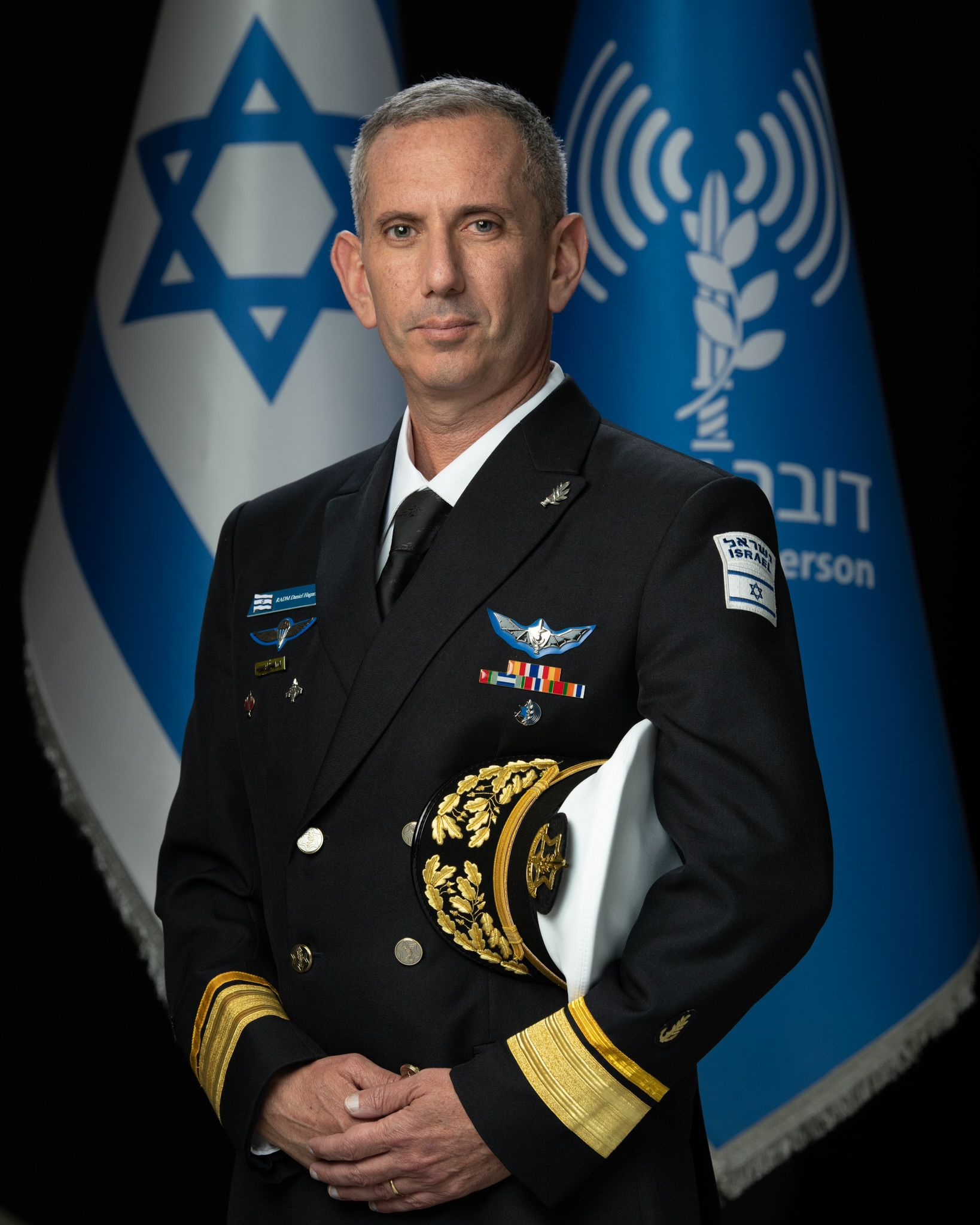
- Born: 1976 (age 49–50); Tel Aviv, Israel
- Military career
- Allegiance: Israel
- Branch: Israeli Navy
- Service years: 1995–2025
- Rank: Tat-Aluf (rear admiral)
- Nickname: Dani
- Unit: IDF Spokesperson's Unit
- Commands: Office of the Chief of Staff; IDF Navy Operations Directorate; Shayetet 13; Head of the Navy's fleet; IDF Spokesperson's Unit
- Conflicts: First Intifada; South Lebanon conflict (1985–2000); Second Intifada; Operation Defensive Shield; 2006 Lebanon War; Operation Cast Lead; Operation Pillar of Defense; Operation Brother's Keeper; Operation Protective Edge; Operation Northern Shield; Gaza war (Operation Swords of Iron)

Daniel Hagari (Hebrew: דניאל "דני" הגרי; born 1976) is a retired Israel Defense Forces Rear Admiral (Tat-Aluf) who served as the head of the IDF Spokesperson's Unit from 2023 to 2025. Previously he served as the commander of the Israeli Navy's operations directorate, the Chief of Staff's assistant, Commander of the Shayetet 13 marine commando unit and head of the office of the Chief of Staff.

== Military service ==
Hagari joined the Israel Defense Forces in March 1995, and volunteered to the naval special operations unit, Shayetet 13. After completing the warrior course training in the Shaytet, he then went to the infantry officer course. At the end of the course he returned to the Shayetet 13, and was appointed a platoon commander during Operation Defensive Shield. He later served as deputy commander of the Gadsar Nahal between 2003 and 2004.

In 2007, Hagari was promoted to the rank of lieutenant colonel (Sgan-Aluf) and appointed commander of a vessel squadron in Shayetet 13, and served in this position until 2009. He was then appointed commander of a training squadron in Shayetet 13 between 2009 and 2011. He later served as deputy commander of Shayetet 13 between 2011 and 2012. Afterwards he was appointed head of the Chief of Staff Benny Gantz's office, a position he served in between the years 2013–2015.

In 2015, Hagari was promoted to the rank of colonel (Aluf-Mishne) and appointed head of the operations directorate of the Israeli Navy, until 2017. In May 2017, he was appointed as Chief of Staff's Gadi Eizenkot's assistant, and served in the position during the Northern Shield operation; in this position, he served until 2019. On 31 July 2019, he was appointed Commander of Shayetet 13, a position in which he served until 15 June 2021. For the activities of Shayetet 13 under his command, he was awarded the Chief of Staff Medal of Appreciation and the Chief of Staff's award for outstanding units in 2020, and the Chief of Staff's citation on 16 June 2021. At the end of his position, he was promoted to the rank of Brigadier General (Tat-Aluf) and on 17 June 2021, he assumed his position as the Chief of the Navy's Fleet.

On 29 March 2023, Hagari was appointed Chief of the IDF Spokesperson's Unit, succeeding Ran Kochav. Hagari's appointment was the continuation of a recent policy to tap career military officials instead of civilian journalists as head of the Spokesperson's Unit.

On 14 November 2023, in a video posted on official IDF web channels, Hagari guided viewers through the basements of Al-Shifa Hospital and Rantisi Children's Hospital in Gaza after their capture by Israeli forces. The goal of this video was to convey "evidence" of Hamas' use of these facilities as headquarters or for other war purposes – a claim that was denied by the Islamist organization, as well as by humanitarian and medical organizations working at the health facilities. A key part of the video was what Hagari claimed was a list of names and dates stuck to the basement wall, showing Hamas militants' shifts in guarding Israeli hostages. In fact, the list showed not names, but the days of the week, written in Arabic.

In December 2024, Hagari was reprimanded for overstepping his authority. During a press briefing, Hagari had criticized a bill in the Knesset that would grant immunity to defense personnel leaking classified information to the prime minister. Hagari called the bill "very dangerous to state security and to the IDF". He later acknowledged his overreach and apologized for his remarks. The Knesset bill was widely viewed as related to the BibiLeaks scandal, in which doctored intelligence had been leaked by Israeli Prime Minister Benjamin Netanyahu's office to the German tabloid Bild-Zeitung as well as The Jewish Chronicle.

On 7 March 2025, after a conversation between the Lieutenant general Eyal Zamir, Chief of the General Staff, and Hagari, they agreed that Hagari would end his role during the next weeks. It was claimed that Hagari requested the Major general rank, and Zamir declined. During the Twelve-Day War between Iran and Israel, Hagari returned to duty, serving behind the scenes as the acting director of the Spokesperson’s Unit and overseeing internal operations from the media operations center, known by its Hebrew acronym Hamad. He went back into retirement after the end of the war.

== Personal life ==
Hagari grew up with two brothers in Tel Aviv. He has a wife and four children. He earned a bachelor's degree in philosophy and a master's degree in diplomacy and security, both from Tel Aviv University.

== Reception ==
Hagari was well loved as a spokesperson in Israel, being seen as a trusted voice during the Gaza war, offering a calm presence for Israelis during his many media appearances at a time of national turmoil. While popular with the public, Hagari clashed with Israel's political echelon, notably defense minister Israel Katz, and was criticized by Haaretz columnist Gideon Levy as essentially a propagandist who told comforting lies.

== Awards and decorations ==
Hagari was awarded three campaign ribbons for his service during three conflicts, as well as one Chief of Staff Citation.

Chief of Staff Citation	Second Lebanon War	South Lebanon Security Zone	Operation Protective Edge

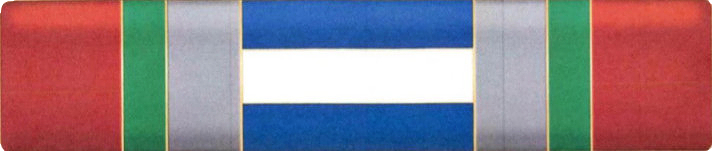
