= Menucha Rochel Slonim =

Israeli rebbetzin (1798–1888)

Rebbetzin Menucha Rochel Slonim (1798–1888) was a daughter of the Mitteler Rebbe (Rabbi Dovber Schneuri), the second Rebbe of the Chabad Hasidic dynasty. She is regarded a matriarch to the Chabad dynasty as well as Hebron's Jewish population in general.

== Origin of name ==
Rebbetzin Slonim was born on the 19 Kislev, 5559 AM (27 November 1798), the same day her grandfather, Rabbi Shneur Zalman of Liadi was released from imprisonment in S. Petersburg. Her father chose the name Menucha because in Hebrew the word "menucha" means "peace and quiet". He said, "Henceforth we shall have a little Menucha." She was named Rochel after an aunt that died in her youth.

Her husband's last name was originally Griver, a descendant of Rabbi Moses Isserles, the Rema; they chose to change it to Slonim (this was when it was still easy to change names). They then moved to Hebron.

== Emigration to Hebron ==
After she fell dangerously ill, her father promised that she would live to emigrate to the Land of Israel. In 1845, with the blessing of her brother-in-law, Rabbi Menachem Mendel Schneersohn, she and her family emigrated to Hebron. To allay her fears of rainstorms on the journey to Hebron, Rabbi Schneersohn blessed her to "walk between the raindrops."

== Life in Hebron ==
For forty-three years she served as the matriarch of the Hebron community. New brides and barren women would request blessings from her. Before she died on the 24th of Shevat, 5648 AM (6 February 1888), she sent a letter to the then Rebbe, Rabbi Sholom Dovber Schneersohn, informing him of her imminent passing. She thus lived during the leadership of all of the first five Lubavitcher Rebbes.

She became renowned among both townspeople and beyond, Jews and non-Jews alike for her curative and salvation abilities, and was nicknamed "the grandmother Menucha Rachel". Every bride who visited the Tomb of Machpela on the day of her wedding came to get her blessing and the Admor Rebbe Elazar Mendel of Lelov used to visit her home three times a week when staying in Hebron. He was strict about standing when she entered or left the room and always asked her to bless him.

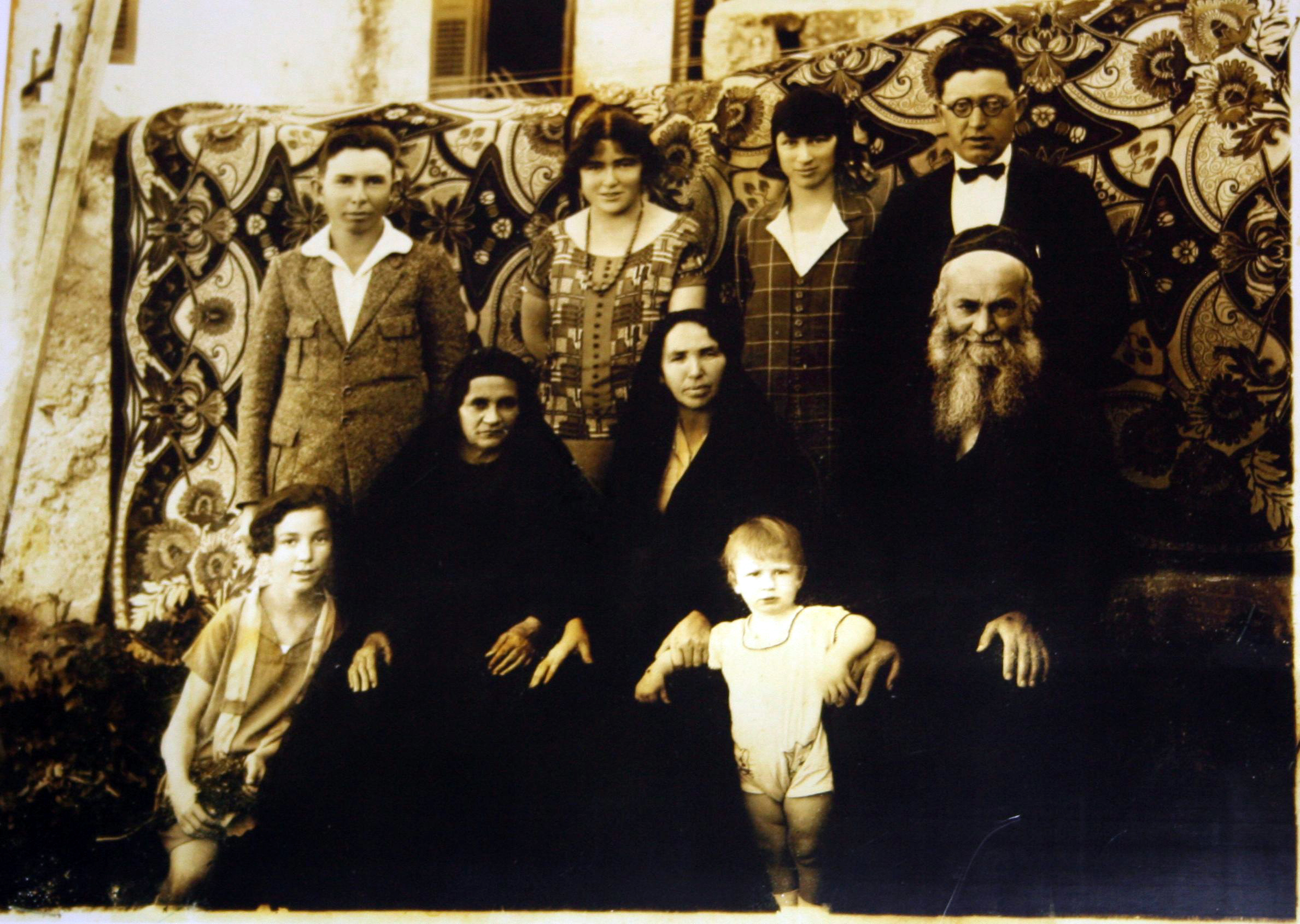
The family of Eliezer Dan Slonim of Hebron.

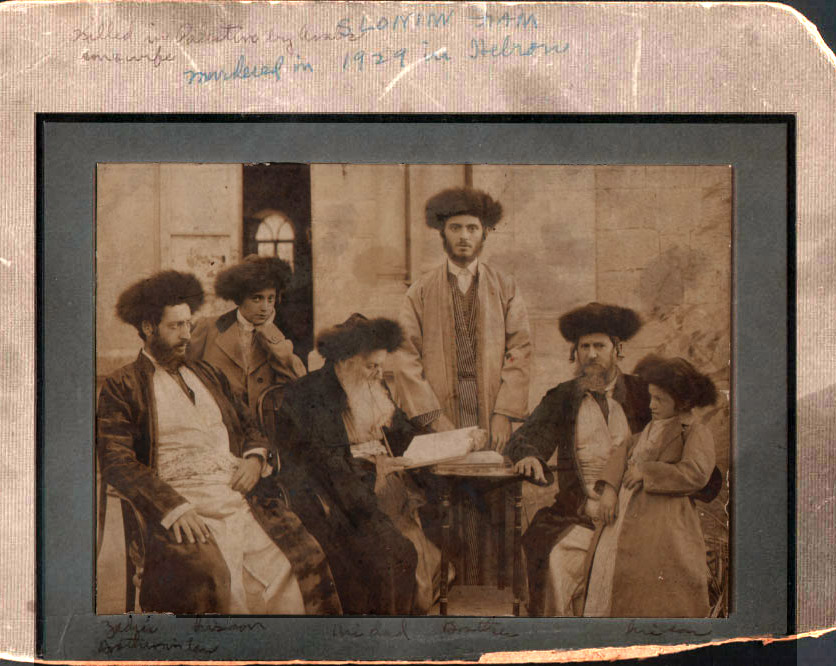
The family of Rabbi Mordechai Dov Slonim, son of Rabbi Ya’akov Slonim and Rebbetzin Menucha Rochel Slonim of Hebron.

Her family went on to become leaders of the Hebron Jewish community, helping unite the Sephardic and Ashkenazic Jewish communities and reaching out to the Arabic community. Her son was Rabbi Yehuda Leib Slonim, who was the father of Rebbetzin Moshke Devora Epstein, who inherited Menucha Rochel's home when she got married. Other children included Rabbi Mordechai Dov Slonim.

Rabbi Yaakov Yosef Slonim was the chief Ashkenazi rabbi during the 1929 Hebron massacre. His son was Eliezer Dan Slonim, who spoke fluent Arabic and was a member on the city council and a director of the Anglo-Palestine Bank. He had excellent relations with the British Mandate authorities and Arab community and was reported to have not believed in rumors of an impending riot. He and his family were slaughtered as they attempted to make a barricade in the Slonim family house. One-year-old Shlomo Slonim (1928-2014) survived the massacre. He was the grandson of Rabbi Yaakov Yosef Slonim and son of Eliezer Dan Slonim. Shlomo Slonim went on to join the Irgun Tzvai Leumi, the Haganah, and the Israel Defense Forces. He worked for Bank Leumi for almost 50 years, was married for 50 years, and had 4 children. His photo as a wounded toddler is included in the Museum of the Jewish Community of Hebron as are many photos of the Slonim family.

== Annual visits to grave in Hebron ==
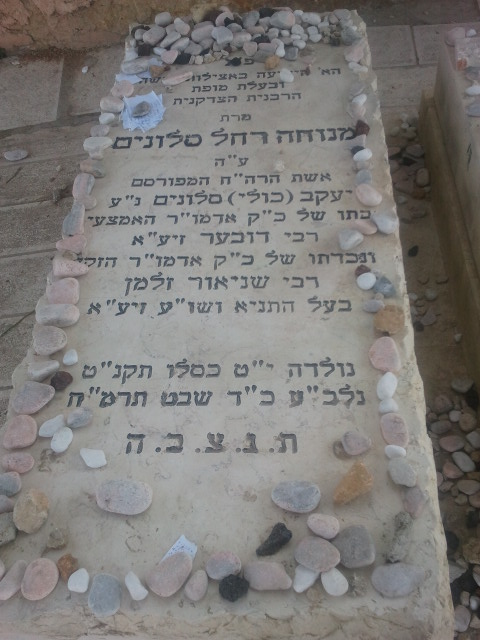
Grave of Menucha Rochel Slonim in Hebron.

Today, the grave of Menucha Rochel Slonim receives hundreds of visitors every year, especially on the anniversary of her death. It is located in the Old Jewish cemetery, Hebron. The grave made headlines in 1997, when the H1 and H2 sections of the city were created. Concerned residents and supporters protested the government to ensure that the cemetery and Menucha Rochel's final resting place were not left outside of the designated area. Other venerated Jewish scholars buried in the cemetery include Eliyahu de Vidas, Solomon Adeni, Elijah Mizrachi and Yehuda Bibas.

Today, the local Chabad chapter in Hebron leads visits to her grave and continues her legacy. In 2002 The Menucha Rochel Kollel, a learning center moved to a historic building adjacent to the grave of Menucha Rochel in the cemetery. Daily classes and services are held there.
