= List of continuous Jewish settlements in Israel =

This is a non-comprehsive list of continuous Jewish settlements in Israel.

- Akko
- Hebron
- Peki'in
- Safed
- Tiberias
