= Beit HaShalom =

Four-story apartment building in Hebron, West Bank

Coordinates: 31°31′36.17″N 35°6′47.62″E

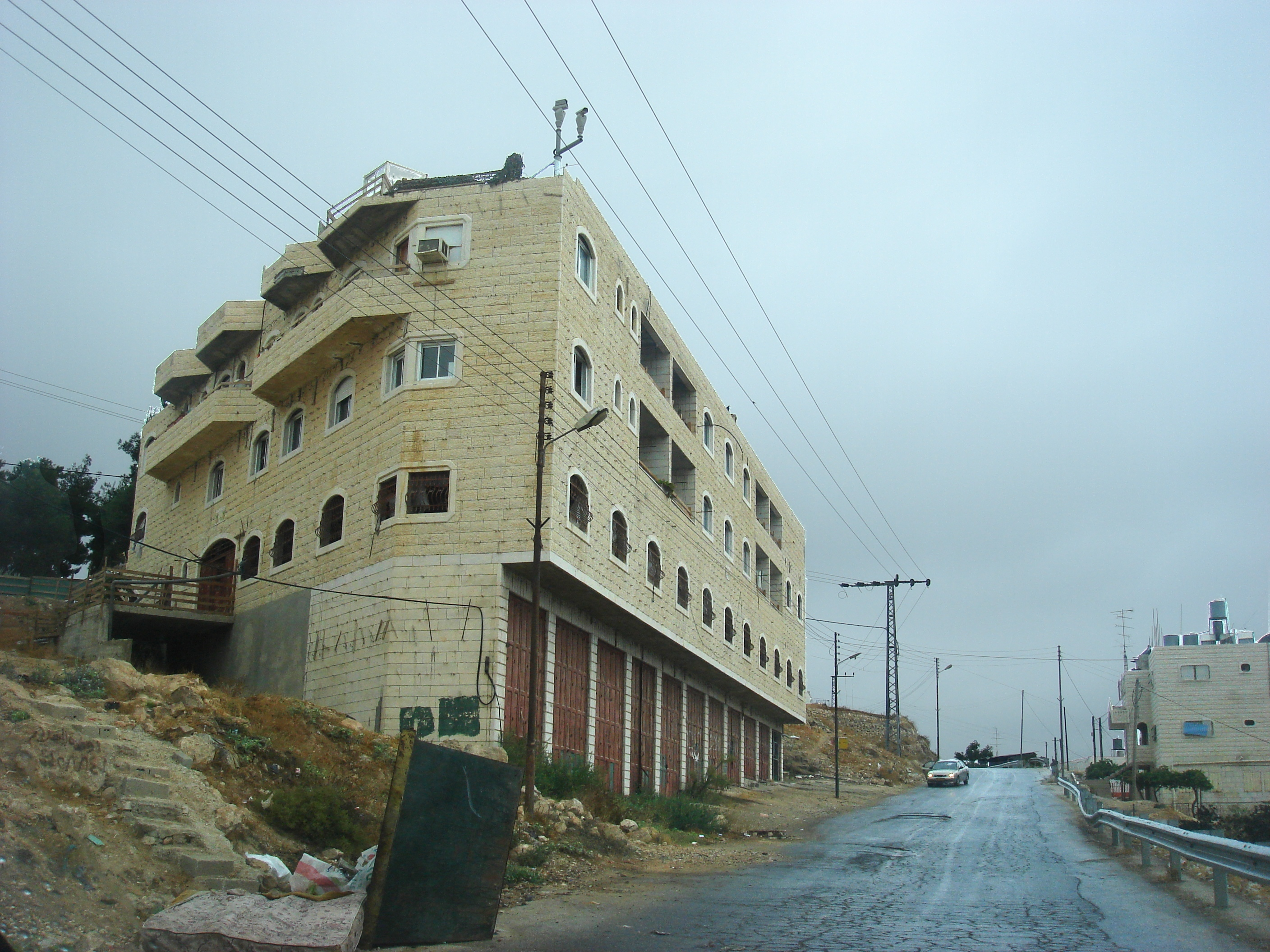
Beit HaShalom, September 2008

Beit HaShalom, (Hebrew: בית השלום, lit. House of Peace) or the Rajabi House, also known as Beit HaMeriva ("House of Contention"), is a four-story apartment building located in the H-2 Area of Hebron, in the West Bank.

Originally built by two Palestinian businessmen, the building was later purchased and inhabited by Israeli settlers in 2007. The legitimacy of the purchase was questioned by the original builder and the case was taken to court. The Israel Police stated after an investigation that the documents purporting to show proof of purchase had been forged. In December 2008, the settlers were evacuated by the IDF following an Israeli Supreme Court order. In September 2012, the Jerusalem District Court ruled that the purchase was indeed valid, and that the house must be returned to the purchasers.

In March 2014, the Israeli Supreme Court upheld the ruling. The Israeli Defense Minister subsequently allowed the settlers to reinhabit the building.

The international community considers Israeli settlements in the West Bank illegal under international law, but the Israeli government disputes this.

== History and location ==
The building is located in the eastern border of Hebron. It is situated along the road running north-south, connecting the settlements of Givat Ha'avot, and Kiryat Arba including Givat Harsina, with the Cave of the Patriarchs. The road is known as Othman bin Affan Street, Zion Route, and Worshipers Way. An Israeli checkpoint is nearby.

The building is named after Palestinian businessman Faez Rajabi who, together with Abdelkader Salwar, originally purchased the land and hired Hebron resident Majdi Al-Ja'abari to construct the four-story structure. The construction of the building in Hebron's a-Ras neighbourhood, on a 1,100-square-metre property with space for some 20 apartments, began in 1995. The Palestinian developers originally designed it for their own use as shops and apartments, but the construction was not fully finished. A number of young Palestinian families had paid down payments for their future apartments.

Construction was suspended in 2000, according to Al-Ja'abari due to pressure from the settlers and their mounting presence in the region. After the intervention of many human rights organisations, and local and international media, the IDF eventually allowed Al-Ja'abari to proceed with the construction in 2007.

== Settlers' occupancy of the building ==
On 19 March 2007, over 200 Jews, mostly yeshiva students from the Hebron area, entered the building in the evening hours. They reached the building by running through an Arab village. The decision to enter the building that day was reached after the construction of the building was restarted, and the Jews of Hebron received information that Arabs intended to enter the building in the near future.

The settlers named the house "The Peace House". Hebron Jewish Community's spokesperson Noam Arnon said the entry into the house was not meant for provocation but for peaceful residence by Jews. About the importance of the building, spokesmen stressed: "The house of peace, on the main road between Hebron and Kiryat Arba is an additional link in the growth of the City of the Patriarchs and Matriarchs. Bonding Hebron and Kiryat Arba, this building will provide homes for dozens, if not hundreds of Israelis, waiting to live in Hebron". The IDF, who arrived upon the take-over, provided security for the settlers.

On the same day, Rajabi filed a complaint with the Israel Police, charging that the settlers were trespassers, and had occupied his building by force. Over the next week, two Palestinians suspected of selling the house were detained; one arrested in Jordan, the other by the Palestinian Authority. Hebron's Jewish Committee condemned the arrests, and accused the PA of having an "anti-Semitic nature" and "prevalent racial hatred". Rajabi was summoned to Jericho by the Palestinian Authority, and detained for 6 months "for his own security".

=== Reactions of the authorities ===
The settlement was politically controversial as was the legality of the purchase. The Israeli Civil Administration initially decided that the settlers' move into the house was illegal and they must be evacuated. It advised Defense Minister Amir Peretz to order an immediate evacuation of the house, based on the argument that the settlers did not receive the necessary permits from the Civil Administration. The settlers could have been evacuated under Civil Administration Order 25, which determined that the occupation or transfer of ownership of homes in the West Bank by Jews requires the approval of the head of the civil administration. The legal basis for the Defense Minister's decision to evacuate the home in Hebron also came from a 1980 cabinet decision, when then-prime minister Menachem Begin's government decided that the cabinet was the only body authorized to approve the expansion of the Israeli community in Hebron. Defense Minister Amir Peretz and Deputy Defense Minister Efraim Sneh expected the evacuation to be completed by mid-May 2007. But ministers and MKs who spoke to Prime Minister Ehud Olmert said he opposed evacuating the home at this stage, and hinted that he would prefer to block an evacuation until after the Labor primary, when Olmert was expected to have an easier defense minister with which to work. A clear majority against the evacuation was expected if the matter would come to a vote in the cabinet.

The Ministry of Defense prohibited the occupants from making improvements to the building to render it habitable for winter - upholding a court order that forbade any change in the status quo of the house. The building had no windows, only gaps where windows were intended to be installed. The gaps were sealed with plastic sheets.

== Eviction order ==
On 27 November 2007, the Civil Administration issued eviction orders against the occupants. The settlers' lawyer Attorney Nadav Ha'etzni, representing the claimed purchasers "Tal Construction and Investment of Karnei Shomron" and the "Society for the Renewal of the Jewish Community in Hebron", petitioned the High Court against the order. In January 2008, the state defended its decision to recognize the settlers as "recent trespassers", and to evict them as quickly as possible because there was insufficient evidence to prove that the sale of the building had been completed. Pending the case in a military appeals court concerning the sale of the building, however, the Court decided to delay the judgement on the eviction.

In November 2008, the High Court ordered the vacation of the building and named the State temporary custodian of the property, pending a ruling on the proprietary rights. Ehud Olmert declared that he did not want to execute the Court's order, but merely stop the repeated settler attacks on Palestinian civilians and property. After the Court had ruled in favour of the government's decision to evacuate the site, the settlers built barricades, and prepared to resist efforts to have them evicted. Baruch Marzel declared that "We must go to war, using any means to prevent this crime from occurring."

Ma'an News Agency reported that, in the days prior to the evacuation, settlers repeatedly attacked Palestinian homes in the city and fired at them at random. Settlers set fire to two Palestinian homes and a store. Over three days they rioted in Hebron, attacking Palestinians with stones and clubs while Israeli soldiers and police looked on. On 4 December 2008, the Israeli settlers were evacuated from the site by Israeli police. The evacuation took an hour and was carried out by some 600 members of the security forces. The confrontation itself was less violent than had been feared.

=== Violence following evacuation ===
However, following the evacuation on 4 December 2008, Israeli extremists embarked on an "unprecedented rampage" through Hebron. UN OCHA field worker Tareq Talahme claimed that "hundreds" of settlers entered Hebron and torched fields, olive groves, and yards in the nearby Wadi Nasara (Wadi al Hussein), between Hebron and Kiryat Arba. They set fire to 5 houses near the building, and damaged more than 27 cars. Settler youths took over a Palestinian home in the valley and caused extensive damage. Settlers fired at Palestinians. A man was caught on videotape shooting at a Palestinian and his son in Wadi al Hussein'. Both Palestinians were evacuated by the IDF in serious condition. The shooting incidents and destructions in the valley were recorded in affidavits by Al-Haq. Two Kiryat Arba residents, suspected of shooting at Palestinians at close range were arrested. The shooting was filmed by B'Tselem members. Israelis and Palestinians clashed after settlers entered the Palestinian-controlled part of Hebron (Area H1) and set fire to at least three cars. A Palestinian news team that was filming the violence was attacked. Settlers vandalized Palestinian property and pelt homes with rocks through the West Bank. The press reported that settlers attacked the villages of Burin and Huwara, south of Nablus, damaging homes, burning trees, agricultural fields and cars late on 4 December. Rabbis for Human Rights reported that most northern West Bank roads were blocked by settlers, and widespread fires were visible in the Nablus region.

== Legal battle for ownership ==
=== Contract and forged documents ===
According to Haaretz, the settlers had purchased the property after several years of negotiations with the Palestinian owners. The settlers claimed they had bought the house legally, and had signed a contract, a claim which the Palestinians denied.

On 3 July 2007, the Israeli State declared before the High Court that the police forensics department had found that the documents which supported the settlers' claim of legal ownership had been forgeries - or provided serious doubt regarding their authenticity. The Palestinian claimants admitted that they had indeed agreed to transfer ownership of the property to a third party, but claimed the deal was later cancelled. They did not provide documentation to support this claim.

In January 2008, in response to a petition by the settlers against eviction orders, the state declared that the Palestinian owner of the building was undoubtedly in possession of the property when settlers took it over on 19 March 2007. The state recognized the settlers as "recent trespassers", and said that there was insufficient evidence to prove that the sale of the building to the Israeli purchasers had been completed. According to the state, a contract for the sale of the building was indeed signed between Rajabi and a Palestinian partner on the one side, and Ayub Jaber, a Palestinian intermediary for the purchasers, on the other, in return for 460,000 Jordanian dinars. However, many documents the alleged Israeli purchasers presented to the police Crimes Investigation Unit were forged. The state's attorney wrote ″We are talking about large-scale forgeries of many documents that were supposed to support the petitioners' [the settlers'] claims″. The company that purchased the property had in recent years already been involved with suspected forgery and fraud upon house purchases.

In November 2008, the settlers' lawyer Nadav Ha'etzni stated that his clients had purchased the building as early as 2004. A Palestinian front man, Ayub Yosef Jaber, had signed a contract with Rajabi on 23 March 2004. A video in which, according to the Jerusalem Post, Rajabi was seen signing the sales contract was submitted to the Court. Ayub Jaber, who worked on behalf of the Israeli group, signed the sale agreement with the Jordanian front company "Tal Building and Investments Karnei Shomron".

=== Court rulings ===
In September 2012, the Jerusalem District Court ruled that the purchase was indeed valid and the house must be returned to the purchasers within one month. It dismissed the claim that the purchase agreement had been annulled before it was finalized. However, the judge stressed that he was not ordering the Civil Administration to pursue legal measures that would give the settlers authorization to live in the house. Nachi Eyal, Director of the Legal Forum for the Land of Israel, commented that "The Minister of Defense and representatives of the State Prosecutor need to apologize and compensate the owners in Hebron".

On 11 March 2014, the Supreme Court affirmed the ruling of the Jerusalem District Court regarding ownership. The court found that the original vendors had turned a blind eye to the fact that the buyer was a strawman working for an Israeli group. The court determined that the property should only be handed over after approval of the Minister of Defense to register the property in the name of the settlers. The ruling also did not oblige the Government to register the settler’s rights. However, the court ruled that the purchasers still owed the vendor $217,000 on the transaction, and could not reinhabit the property until the outstanding sum had been paid. Peace Now called the potential new settlement "a disaster-in-the-Making".

=== Approval of the Defense minister ===
Following the High Court's decision, Defense Minister Moshe Ya'alon approved the return of the building's new owners on 13 April 2014. Soon after the Defense Minister’s decision, three families moved in.

In response to Ya'alon's approval, United Nations Special Rapporteur Richard Falk urged Israel to prevent settlers from taking over the Al-Rajabi House. He said that "Hebron embodies all the worst features of apartheid, colonialism and oppression that are to be found throughout Occupied Palestine". He added that the establishment of this settlement at Al-Rajabi House was a move toward connecting the settlement of Kiryat Arba with the other outposts in the Old City of Hebron and the Cave of the Patriarchs.

Beit HaShalom is the first new settlement established inside Hebron since the 1980s and the first settlement in this particular part of Hebron. Meretz MK Zehava Gal-On noted that severe restrictions on the movements of Palestinians who live on the road already existed, and stated that the new settlement would only worsen their situation, a prospect envisaged by other observers. It will be the fifth settlement within the Hebron municipality boundaries, after Beit Hadassah, Avraham Avinu, Beit Romano and Tel Rumeida.

== Financier ==
The man behind the scenes who had financed the purchase of the house was revealed as a Jewish man from Brooklyn, Morris Abraham. He was reportedly a descendant of the earlier Hebron Jewish community. He said that his family survived the 1929 Hebron massacre.

== The settlement under international law ==
The international community considers Israeli settlements in the West Bank illegal under international law, but the Israeli government disputes this.

According to Richard Falk, the Beit HaShalom settlement is considered illegal under international law and violates article 49 of the Fourth Geneva Convention.

== The settlement under Palestinian law ==
For purchasing land or property in Palestine, people who do not hold an I.D. from the West Bank or Gaza must have a Buyer's Permit Approval from the Palestinian Authority. A Palestinian Authority court ruled in 2010 that selling, or attempting to sell, land to Jews is punishable by death. Land sales to Jews are considered treason by the Palestinians. The PA court cited a 1979 Palestinian "military law" that banned land sales to Jews and a law dating back to 1953 banning trade with Israelis. However, death penalties were considered in 2010 unlikely to be officially carried out.

== See also ==
- Har Hebron Regional Council
