= Malkiel =

Malkiel is both a given name and a surname. Notable people with the name include:

- Malkiel Ashkenazi, 16th-century Ottoman rabbi
- Malkiel Gruenwald, Israeli hotelier, journalist, and stamp collector
- Malkiel Kotler, Rosh Yeshiva of Beth Medrash Govoha
- Burton Malkiel (born 1932), American economist and writer
- Yakov Malkiel (1914–1998), Russian-born American etymologist and philologist
