= Old Jewish cemetery, Hebron =

Ancient Jewish cemetery in Hebron

Coordinates: 31.5253°N 35.0989°E

- בית העלמין היהודי בחברון
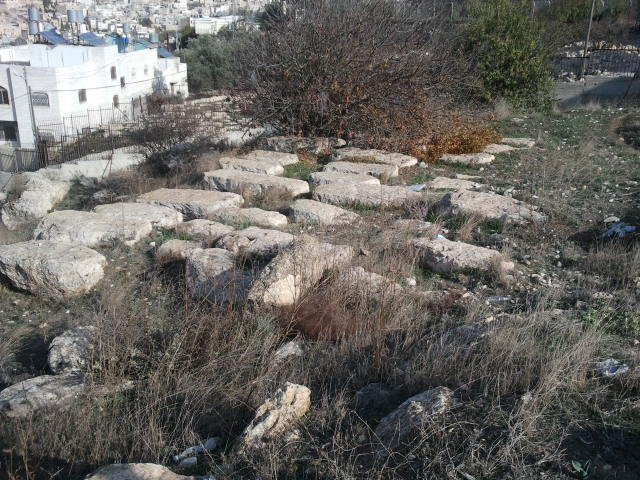

Geography
- Location: Hebron, Israel

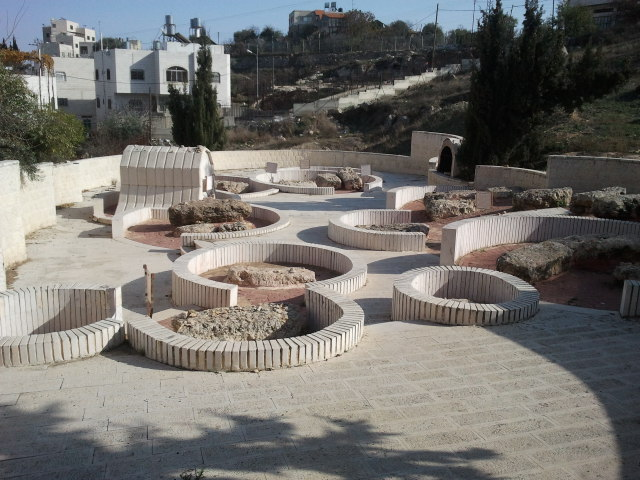
The refurbished plots in the Sephardic section of the Hebron cemetery.

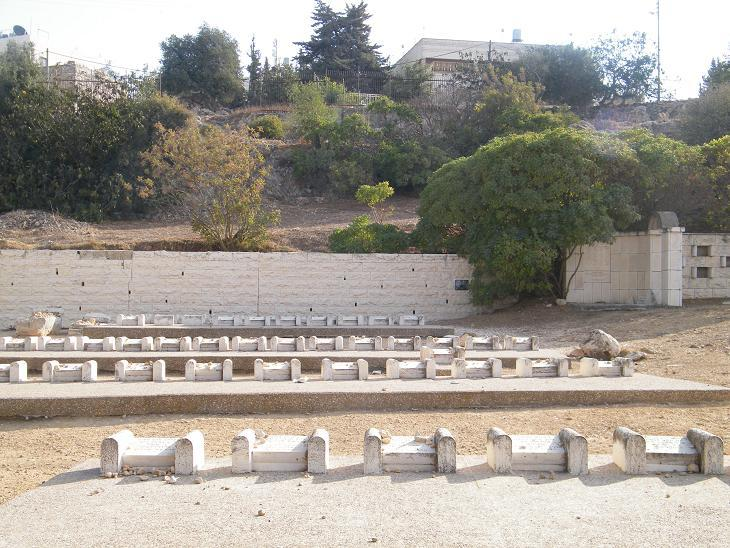
Memorials to victims of the 1929 massacre.

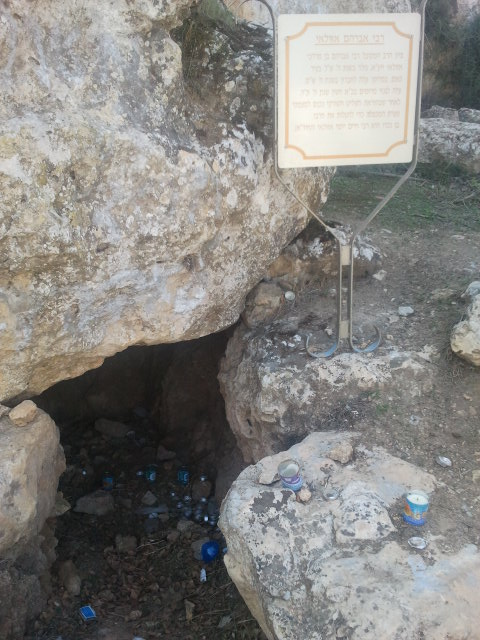
Rabbi Abraham ben Mordecai Azulai's grave in the old cemetery in Hebron

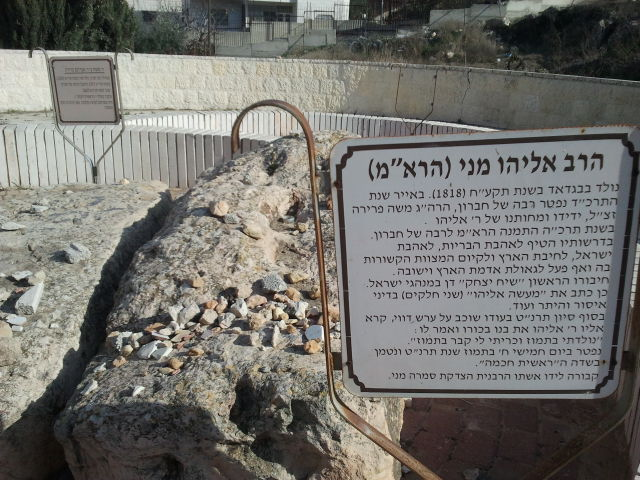
Grave of Rabbi Eliyahu Meni.

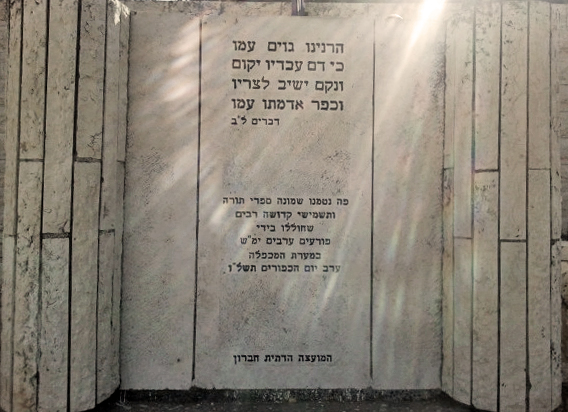
A memorial plot in which lie eight Torah scrolls and religious objects desecrated at the Tomb of the Patriarchs on the eve of Yom Kippur. The monument is located in the ancient cemetery of Hebron.

The old Jewish cemetery in Hebron is located on a hill to the west of the Tomb of Machpela. It has been used as a Jewish cemetery for hundreds of years. Ishtori Haparchi noted the existence of a Jewish cemetery in the area in 1322. The cemetery is also mentioned in a letter dated to 1290.

Among the prominent rabbinical sages and community figures buried in the cemetery include Rabbi Eliyahu de Vidas known as the Reshit Hokhma, Rabbi Abraham Azulai, Rabbi Solomon Adeni, Rabbi Elijah Mizrachi, Rabbi Chaim Hezekiah Medini known as the Sdei Chemed, Rabbi Judah Bibas, Rabbi Haim Rahamim Yosef Franco, Rabbi Hillel Moshe Gelbstein, Rabbi Shimon Menashe Chaikin, and Menucha Rochel Slonim. Menachem Mendel of Kamenitz, the first hotelier in the Land of Israel, references his visit to the grave of Eliyahu de Vidas in his 1839 book Sefer Korot Ha-Itim. He states,

"here I write of the graves of the righteous to which I paid my respects." After describing the Cave of Machpela and the tombs of such Biblical figures as Ruth and Jesse, Othniel Ben Knaz and Abner Ben Ner, he reports, "I also went to a grave said to be that of the Righteous Rav, author of "Reshit Hokhma."

During the Jordanian period (1948–1967), the cemetery was intentionally destroyed and the site was cultivated by Arab residents for growing produce. Around 4,000 tombstones were removed and used for construction purposes.

In the aftermath of the 1967 Six-Day War, Israel convened an inter-ministerial investigating committee to determine the scope of the desecration to Jewish holy sites under Jordanian rule. A local resident declared that before he ploughed the cemetery, a Muslim priest gave him permission "to clean away the graves of the Jews." A former member of the Hebron city council testified that a prominent Palestinian Arab councilor told him that the Jewish cemetery had been destroyed by direct order of the Jordanian government.

After Jews returned to Hebron, they requested that the old Jewish cemetery be reopened. As it was located in a hilly residential area opposite Hebron's main market, initially the Israeli government prohibited the cemetery from being used.

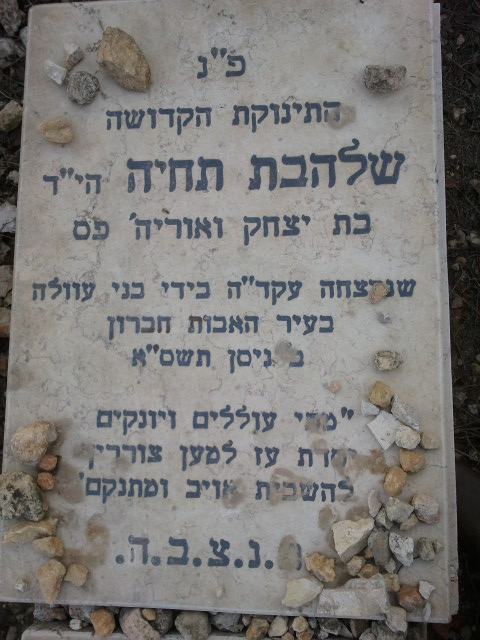
Grave of Shalhevet Pass in the Hebron Cemetery.

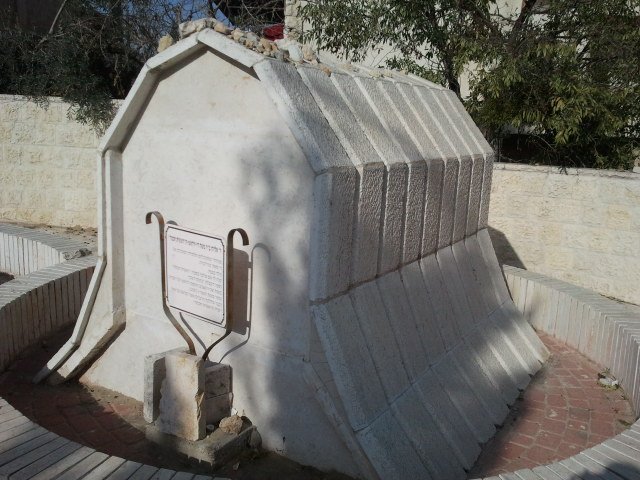
Rabbi Eliyahu de Vidas tombstone in Hebron cemetery.

The cemetery was re-opened for civilian use once again in 1975 when Avraham Yedidya, the sixth month old child of a Hasidic artist Baruch Nachshon and his wife Sarah died of cot death. Initially the Israeli government refused permission to avoid angering local Palestinians, The bereaved mother walked past the roadblock and commiserating soldiers let her pass. Following the burial, the community made efforts to clean up the cemetery. Prof. Ben Zion Tavger, a Russian-Jewish physicist and refusenik who moved to Hebron initiated the refurbishing efforts in the mid-1970s. In time, refurbished tombstones were installed bearing the names of original community members. Since then the site has both attracted visitors from around Israel as well as being targeted by vandalism.

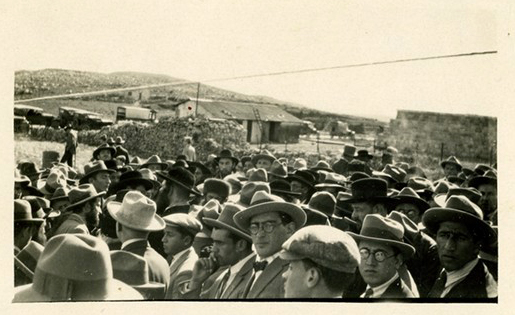
Funeral of Rabbi Natan Tzvi Finkel, the grandfather of the Slabodka yeshiva in Hebron, 1927.

The cemetery also contains four mass graves with the remains of 59 victims of the 1929 Hebron massacre. A corner of the cemetery contains the remains of several Torah scrolls and Jewish prayer books which were torn up and set alight on the eve of Yom Kippur on October 3, 1976, at the Cave of the Patriarchs by rioters.

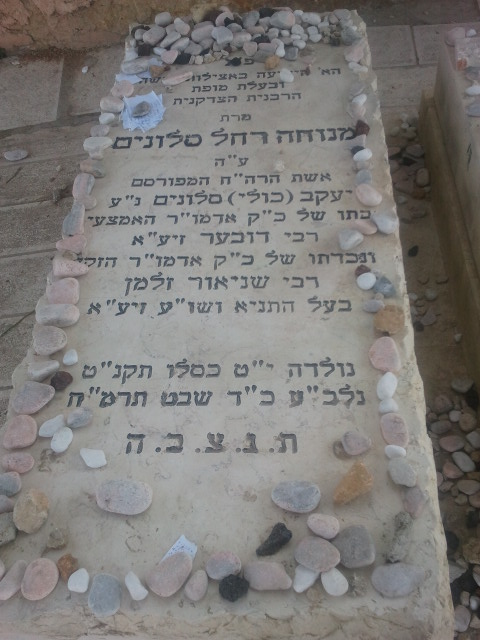
Grave of Menucha Rochel Slonim in Hebron.

Every year hundreds of members of the Chabad Lubavitch hasidic movement attend the anniversary of the passing of Menucha Rochel Slonim, a granddaughter of the founder of Chabad, Rabbi Shneur Zalman of Liadi and a matriarch of the Hebron Jewish community. After a visit to the cemetery, a festive meal and gathering is held attracting top rabbis from around the country.

A small synagogue and learning center was established in a historic building atop the cemetery called the Menucha Rochel kollel.

It was the tradition of the Hebron community not to engrave names on tombstones. Due to the expulsion of the community and subsequent vandalism of the cemetery, the exact identification of many plots were lost. In 2016 a map was discovered that identifies the location of the graves.

== See also ==
- Israeli–Palestinian conflict in Hebron
- History of the Jews in Hebron

== Bibliography ==
- al-Kuwayt, Jāmi'at (2003). Journal of Palestine Studies, Volume 33. Institute for Palestine Studies and Kuwait University.
- Alon, Mati (2004). The Unavoidable Surgery. Trafford Press. ISBN 978-1412215923.
- Auerbach, Jerold S. (2009) Hebron Jews: Memory and Conflict in the Land of Israel. ISBN 978-0742566170
- Mandel, Morris; Gartenberg, Leo (1969). Israel: the story of a miracle. Jonathan David.
- Sherute ha-hasbarah (1967). Jordanian belligerency: a review of Jordan's policies towards the state of Israel. Israel Information Services.
