= Solomon Adeni =

Yemenite Jewish author and Talmudist (1567–1625)

Solomon ben Joshua Adeni
- שלמה בן יהושע

Personal life
- Born: 1567 Sanaa, Yemen
- Died: 1625 (aged 57–58) Hebron, Ottoman Empire
- Parent: Rabbi Joshua (father)
- Notable works: Melekhet Shelomoh; Dibre Emet
- Occupation: Author, Talmudist

Religious life
- Religion: Judaism

Solomon ben Joshua Adeni (Hebrew: שלמה בן יהושע) or Shelomo bar Joshua Adeni (1567–1625) was a Yemenite Jewish author and Talmudist, who lived during the second half of the 16th century at Sanaa and Aden in southern Arabia, from which town he received the name "Adeni" or "the Adenite." In 1571, Solomon Adeni immigrated with his family to Ottoman Palestine. He was a pupil of the Talmudist Bezalel Ashkenazi and of the kabbalist Hayyim Vital.

In 1624, or, according to other authorities, in 1622, he wrote a commentary on the Mishnah, entitled Melekhet Shelomoh (The Work of Solomon). Only a few fragments of this have been published, but they are quite sufficient to indicate the value of the whole work. In this commentary, Adeni exhibits considerable critical ability. He analyzes the Mishnah in a manner that is quite modern, and which is accompanied by a strictly scientific penetration that enables him to enter into the most minute details of the mishnaic text, its punctuation and spelling. The great value of Adeni's work was recognized by Manasseh ben Israel, who made use of its critical conclusions in his edition of the Mishnah of 1632. Adeni incorporated in his work Joseph Ashkenazi's valuable amendments to the Mishnah, and relies heavily upon the commentaries of Rabbi Shimshon of Sens, Rashi and Rabbi Solomon Sirilio. In addition to his commentary he wrote Dibre Emet (Words of Truth), which, according to Azulai, contains critical notes on the Masorah. In 1854 the manuscript of Melekhet Shelomoh, his first work, was in the hands of Nathan Coronel of Jerusalem, whereas that of his second work, Dibre Emet, seems to have been lost. He is buried in the Old Jewish Cemetery in Hebron.

== Family background ==
The only thing known of Adeni's family is what he wrote about them in his Introduction to his Mishnah commentary: "We have also received it as an oral tradition that we are of the party to whom sent Ezra the scribe, requesting them to come up to the land during the building of the Second Temple, and they rebelled and he cursed them, saying that all their days in exile will be spent in poverty. And because of our iniquities, there was fulfilled in us in that Exile, both, poverty in the Law, and poverty in material wealth in a most superlative manner, and especially with my small family! For all of them, according to what was told to me and, indeed, confirmed with me by the tellers of the truth who spoke clearly, were God fearing people, and those who had acquired an accurate knowledge of the Law (Torah), even the disciples of my lord, my father, of blessed memory (for he was the Rabbi of the city Uzal which is called Sanaa). Also before this, my grandfather, the father of my father, was a teacher of small children there. But privation and famine clung to them in such a way that both curses of Ezra were fulfilled in us: The one, being the curse already mentioned; the other one, being the general curse which alarms all schoolteachers that they will never become rich, lest they should cease from their labour."

== See also ==
- Jews of Aden
- History of the Jews in Hebron
