= Joseph Ashkenazi =

To be distinguished from Joseph Askhenazi (1928-1974)

Rabbi Joseph Ashkenazi (Hebrew: יהוסף אשכנזי; 1525–1572) the Tanna of Safed was a critical commentator on the Mishnah, whose glosses are noted in Solomon Adeni's Mele'khet Shelomo.
