= Ben Zion Tavger =

Israeli physicist and activist (1930-1983)

Ben Zion Tavger (Russian: Бенцион Аронович Тавгер, Hebrew: בן ציון טבגר; August 5, 1930 (Barysaw) - July 22, 1983), was a physicist and an activist for the Israeli settlers in Hebron.

== Early years ==
Tavger was born in 1930 in the city of Barysaw (now in Belarus). His family then moved to Gorky (Nizhny Novgorod) in Russia.

He studied physics at Moscow University and at the University of Gorky, graduating in 1952.

In 1961 Tavger began underground Zionist activities, organizing a group of students who studied Zeev Jabotinsky's books and articles and prepared for immigration to Israel.

In 1968, Tavger was expelled from the University of Gorky and deprived of teaching privileges throughout the region. He was subsequently accepted as a senior researcher at the Rzhanov Institute of Semiconductor Physics in Novosibirsk. Here he again led a group of young Zionists.

== Immigration to Israel ==
In May 1972, Tavger immigrated to Israel, arriving at Nazareth Illit absorption center. Yuval Ne'eman, then president of Tel Aviv University, invited to work at the university. Tavger worked at Tel Aviv University until 1974, at the same time trying to set up a science and research institute located in Kiryat Arba, near Hebron.

== Hebron ==
In 1974, Tavger left Tel Aviv University and moved to Kiryat Arba. Soon he began to take part in the restoration efforts of historic sites in nearby Hebron.

In 1975, a four-month-old baby, Avraham Nachson, who had died of Sudden infant death syndrome, was buried in the old Jewish cemetery in Hebron. Residents of Kiryat Arba began to arrange guard duty at the grave due to frequent vandalizing and Tavger volunteered. He began cleaning and restoring the cemetery and the nearby Tomb of Jesse and Ruth.

Tavger was involved in identifying Jewish sites in Hebron destroyed during the Jordanian era, such as cleaning and excavation at the site of the Avraham Avinu Synagogue which had been torn down and its remains used as an animal pen for sheep and goats.

== Later years ==
From 1975, Tavger taught at the Jerusalem College of Technology, where he established a laboratory with Naftali Eisenberg.

Tavger died on July 22, 1983. The area next to the Avraham Avinu Synagogue in Hebron is called "Kiryat Ben-Zion" in his memory. The street leading to the synagogue was also named after him.

== Scientific publications ==
=== Magnetic symmetry ===
- B. Tavger and V. Zaitsev, JETP (Journal of Experimental and Theoretical Physics), Vol. 30, p. 564 (1956)
- B. Tavger. JETP, Vol. 35, p. 467 (1958)
- B. Tavger, Crystallography, Vol. 3, p. 339 (1958)
- B. Tavger, Crystallography, Vol. 3, p. 342 (1958)
- B. Tavger, Crystallography, Vol. 5, p. 667 (1960)
- B. Tavger, Proceedings of Kaliningrad Pedagogical Inst. Vol. 2 (1956)
- B. Tavger, Phys. Lett. A, Vol. 116(3), p. 123-124 (1986)

=== Spatial quantization ===
- B. Tavger, JETP, Vol. 48, p. 185 (1965)
- B. Tavger and V. Kogan, Phys. Lett. Vol. 19, p. 353 (1965)
- B. Tavger and M. Yerukhimov, JETP, Vol. 51, p. 528 (1966)
- B. Tavger and V. Kresin, Phys. Lett. Vol. 20, p. 595 (1966)
- B. Tavger and V. Kresin, JETP, Vol. 47, p. 2318 (1966)
- B. Tavger and V. Demikhovsky, Soviet Physics - "Successes of Physical Sciences", Vol. 96, p. 61 (1968)
- B. Tavger and V. Sokolov, Soviet Physics, Solid State, Vol. 10 N6, p. 1412 (1968)
- B. Tavger and I. Goldfarb (Galili), Soviet Physics, Solid State, Vol. 11, p. 1231 (1969)
- B. Tavger and V. Margulis, JETP, Vol. 31, N2, p. 340 (1970)
- B. Tavger, V. Molin et al., JETP Letters, Vol. 14, p. 215 (1971)
- B. Tavger, M. Blokh, E. Fishman, Soviet Physics of Metal and Metallography, Vol. 33. N6, p. 1137 (1972)
