= Eliyahu de Vidas =

16th-century rabbi and kabbalist in Ottoman Palestine

- אליהו די וידאש
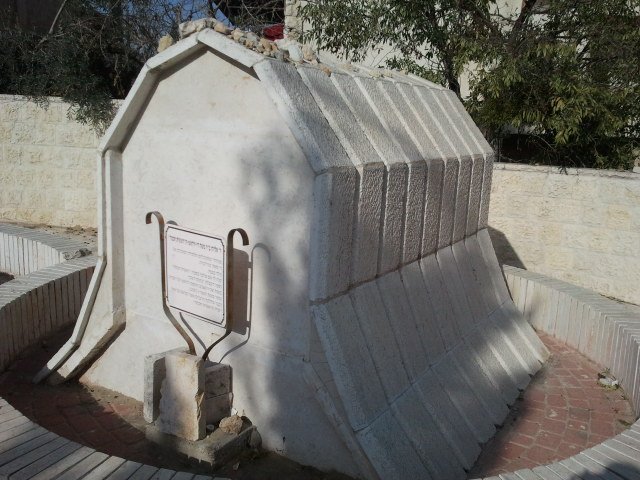
- Tomb of Eliyahu de Vidas in the old Jewish cemetery in Hebron.

Personal life
- Born: 1518
- Died: 1587 (aged 68–69) Hebron, Ottoman Empire
- Notable work: Reshit Chochmah
- Occupation: Rabbi, kabbalist

Religious life
- Religion: Judaism

Jewish leader
- Teacher: Moses ben Jacob Cordovero, Isaac Luria

Eliyahu de Vidas (Hebrew: אליהו די וידאש; 1518–1587, Hebron) was a 16th-century rabbi in Ottoman Palestine. He was primarily a disciple of Moses ben Jacob Cordovero and Isaac Luria. De Vidas is known for his expertise in the Kabbalah, having written the pietistic work Reshit Chochmah (lit. 'Beginning of Wisdom'). Just as his teacher, Moses Cordovero, created an ethical work according to kabbalistic principles in the Tomer Devorah, de Vidas created an even more expansive work on the spiritual life with his Reshit Chochmah. This magnum opus is largely based on the Zohar, but also reflects a wide range of traditional sources. The author lived in Safed and Hebron and was one of a group of prominent kabbalists living in Hebron during the late 16th and early 17th-century.

Aaron ben Menahem Mendel of Kamenitz, the first hotelier in the Land of Israel, references his visit to the grave of Eliyahu de Vidas in his 1839 book Sefer Korot Ha-Itim. He states, "here I write of the graves of the righteous to which I paid my respects." After describing the Cave of the Patriarchs and the tombs of such Biblical figures as Ruth and Jesse, Othniel and Abner, he reports, "I also went to a grave said to be that of the Righteous Rav, author of 'Reshit Hokhma'." Today the grave site has been refurbished and can be visited in the Old Jewish Cemetery in Hebron.
