= Wadi al-Hussein =

Wadi al Hussein, sometimes referred to as 'Wadi Nasara, is a wadi east of and adjacent to the city of Hebron. The valley connects the Kiryat Arba settlement with the Israeli-controlled H2 area of Hebron's old city. The borders of the valley are Othman Bin Afan Street, also known as Zion Street or Worshipers' Way in the west; Wadi Al Nassara in the north; the Kiryat Arba fence in the east; Wadi Al Ghrous and the road connecting Kiryat Arba with Zion Street in the south.

Wadi al Hussein is a valley cultivated and owned by Palestinians between the settlements of Kiryat Arba and Givat Ha'avot.

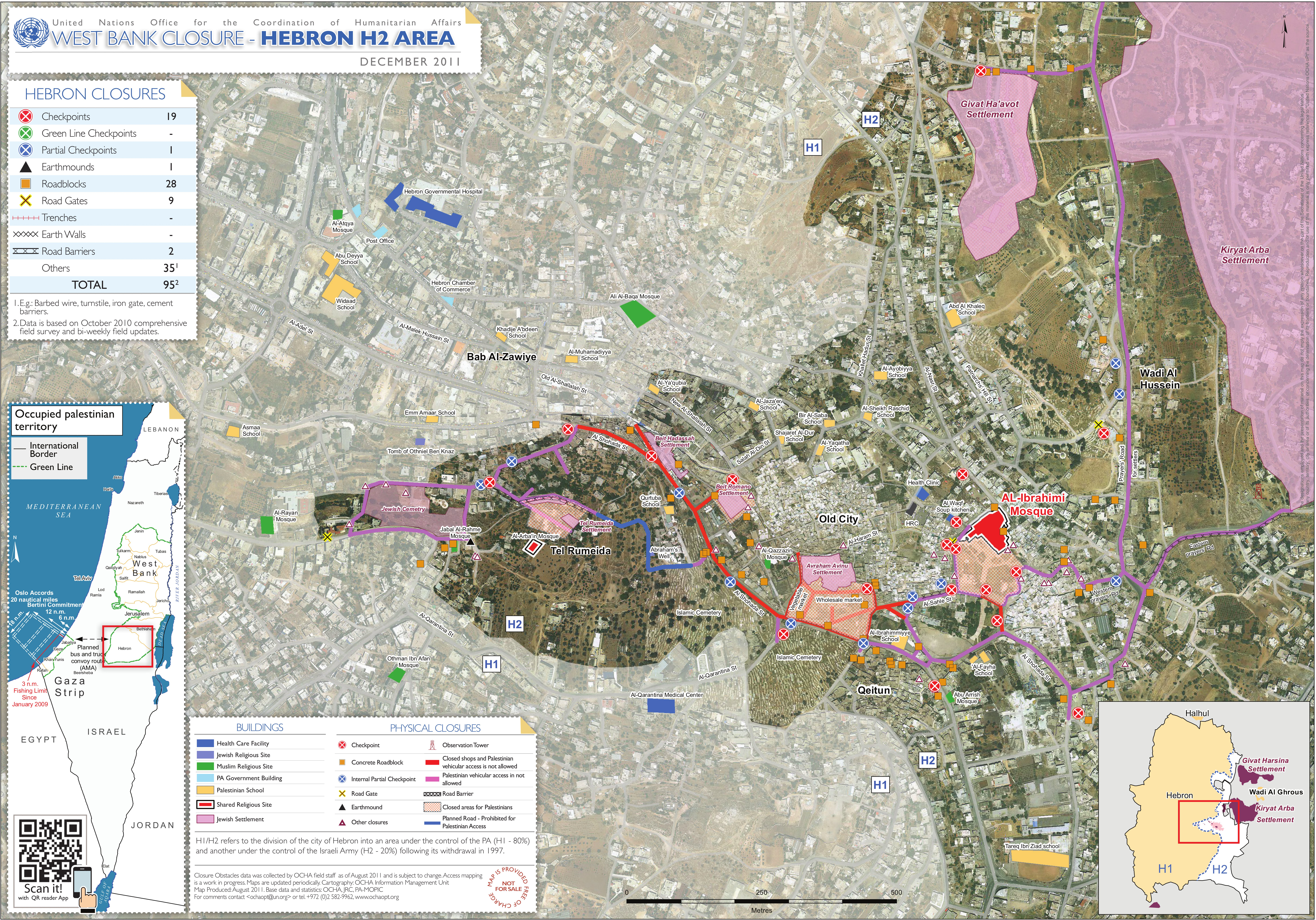
Wadi al Hussein on OCHA map

== Israeli–Palestinian conflict ==
Since the expansion of the settlement Kiryat Arba in 1972, Palestinian inhabitants have suffered frequent attacks from settlers.

As of 2009, access to the Hebron H1 Area was only possible through four checkpoints, which were only available to settler vehicles. The Palestinian population is dependent of medical facilities in the Hebron H1 Area. Palestinian vehicles, including ambulances, are forbidden to enter the neighborhood freely, despite the fact that the population of Wadi al Hussein is entirely Palestinian. Due to the harsh limitations on the freedom of movement, many basic services, even basic access to health care in case of emergency, have become inaccessible to the residents of Wadi al Hussein. Other problems are the denial of building permits, inaccessibility of water sources, and unavailability of sewage networks and garbage disposal services.
