= Avraham Avinu Synagogue =

Synagogue in Hebron, West Bank, Palestine

- Arabic: كنيس أفراهام أفينو; Hebrew: בית הכנסת על שם אברהם אבינו
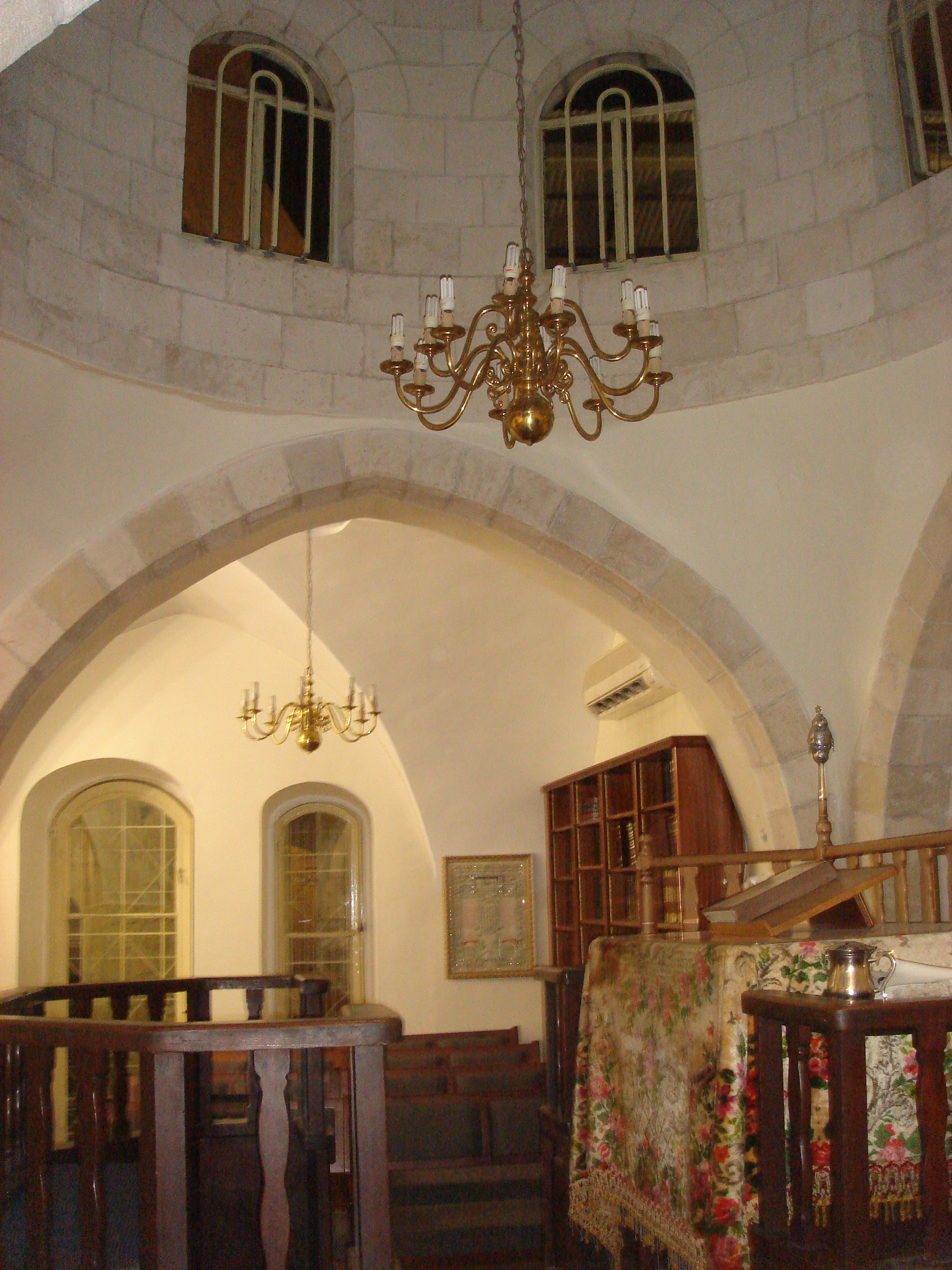
- The synagogue interior, in 2008

- Location of the synagogue in the West Bank

Religion
- Affiliation: Judaism
- Rite: Nusach Sefard
- Ecclesiastical or organizational status: Synagogue (1540–1929); Profane use (1929–1971); Synagogue (since 1977)
- Status: Active

Location
- Location: Old City, Hebron, West Bank
- Country: Palestine
- Interactive map of Avraham Avinu Synagogue
- Coordinates: 31°31′26.24″N 35°6′27.60″E

Architecture
- Type: Synagogue architecture
- Founder: Hakham Malkiel Ashkenazi
- Funded by: Ben Zion Tavger (1970s)
- Completed: 1540; 1977 (rebuilt)
- Demolished: 1948 (partial)
- Dome: One

Website
- aashul.org

The Abraham Avinu Synagogue (Arabic: كنيس أفراهام أفينو; Hebrew: בית הכנסת על שם אברהם אבינו) is a synagogue, located in the Jewish Quarter of Avraham Avinu in the Old City of Hebron, West Bank, Palestine.

Built by Sephardic Jews led by Hakham Malkiel Ashkenazi in 1540, its domed structure represented the physical center of the Jewish Quarter of the Old City of Hebron. The synagogue became the spiritual hub of the Jewish community there and a major center for the study of Kabbalah. It was restored in 1738 and enlarged in 1864; the synagogue stood empty since the 1929 Hebron massacre, was destroyed after 1948, was rebuilt in 1977 and has been open ever since.

== History ==
The synagogue is mentioned by Rabbi Naftali Hertz Bachrach in his 1648 book Emek HaMelech. The book deals with the kabbalah, but in the introduction, he mentions a dramatic story about the Avraham Avinu synagogue.

The synagogue once housed the wooden doors of the Old Synagogue of Gaza, crafted from sycamore. They were lost during the 1929 Hebron massacre. Photographs of the doors still exist.

Jordan took control of the area in 1948, and after this time a wholesale market, trash dump and public toilet were placed on the site of the Jewish Quarter. The ruins of the synagogue were turned into a goat and donkey pen. The adjacent, "Kabbalists' Courtyard" was turned into an abattoir.

In 1971 the Israeli Government approved the rebuilding of the synagogue, courtyard and adjoining buildings. The synagogue was reopened in 1977.

The man instrumental in rebuilding the synagogue was local Hebron resident Ben Zion Tavger. He was a prominent physicist in the Soviet Union at Gorky University noted for his work in the Magnetic Symmetry phenomenon. He moved to Israel in 1972 and became a chair at Tel Aviv University.

The rebuilt synagogue is used by the Jewish residents on Shabbat to hold prayer services. The synagogue is also open to visitors each day of the week so they can learn about the history of the synagogue, and hold private services. A plaque with the cover of the book Emek HaMelech and the full text in the original printing hangs on a plaque on the wall of the rebuilt synagogue.

== Gallery ==
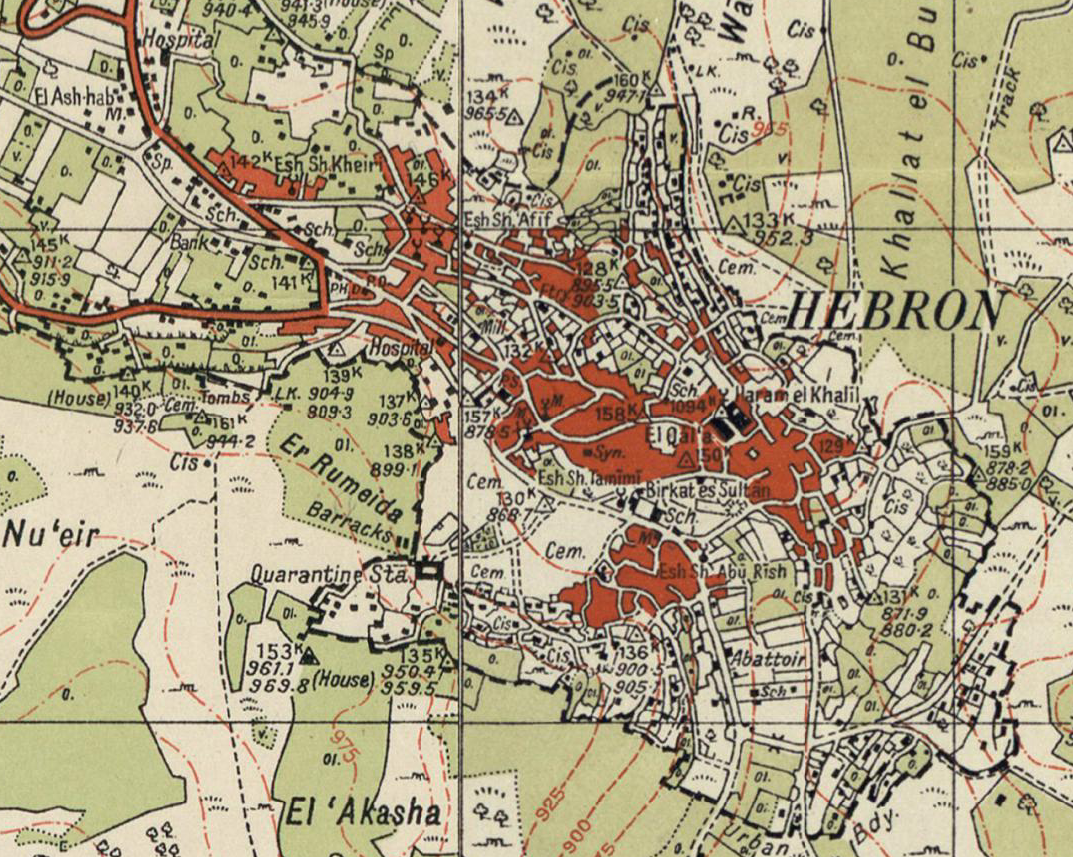
The synagogue, marked "Syn" on a 1940s Survey of Palestine map of the Old City of Hebron.

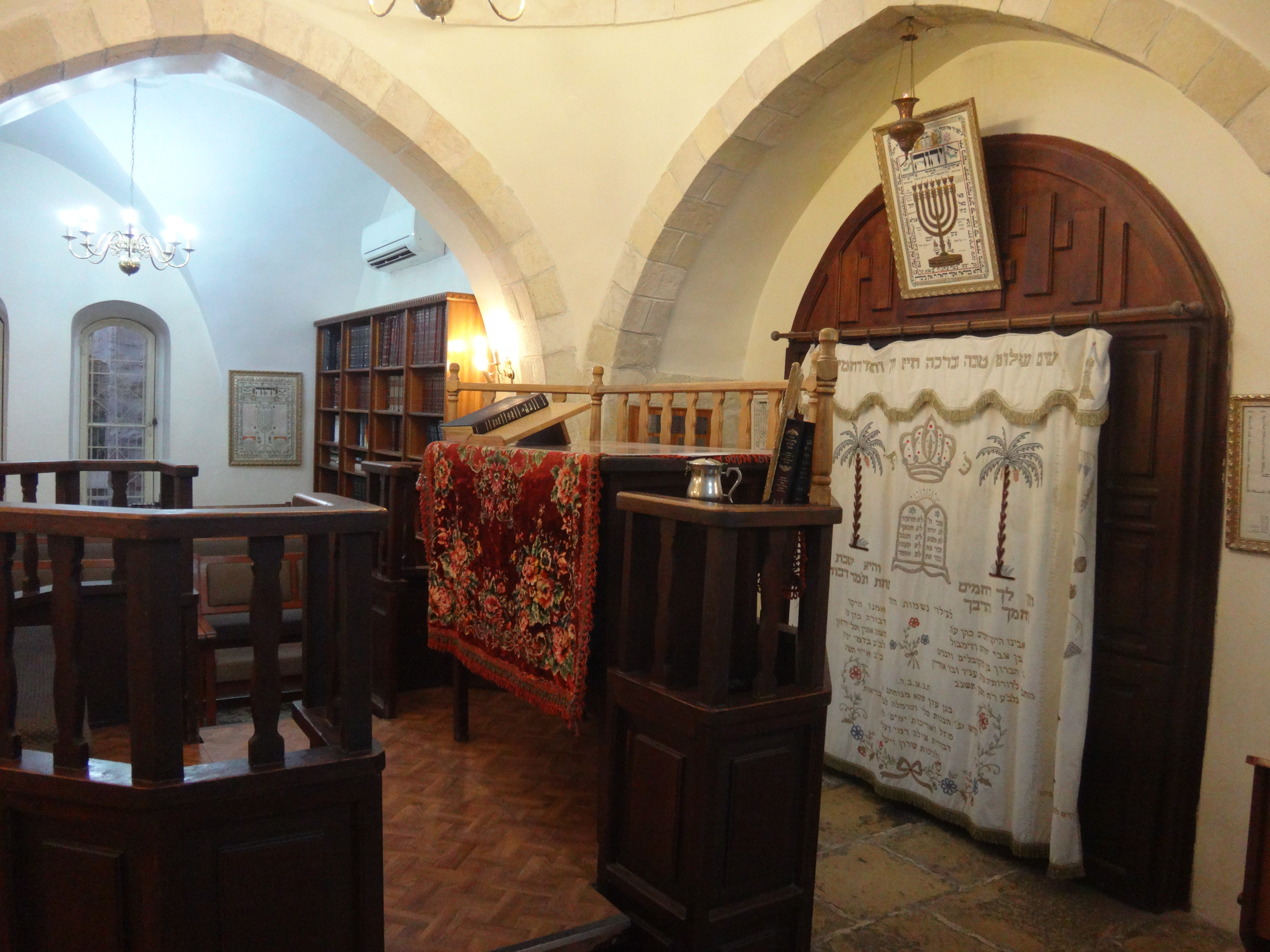
Interior of the synagogue.

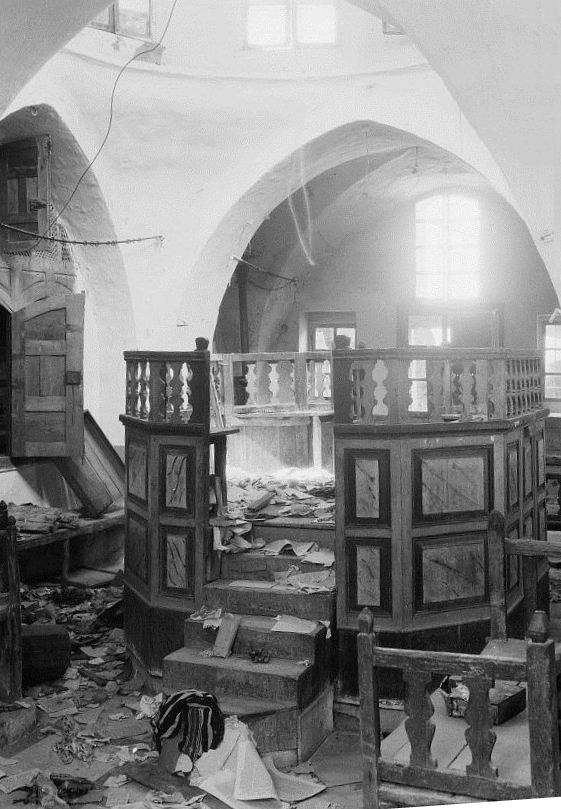
The synagogue in the aftermath of the 1929 riots. (Photo: US Library of Congress archives.)

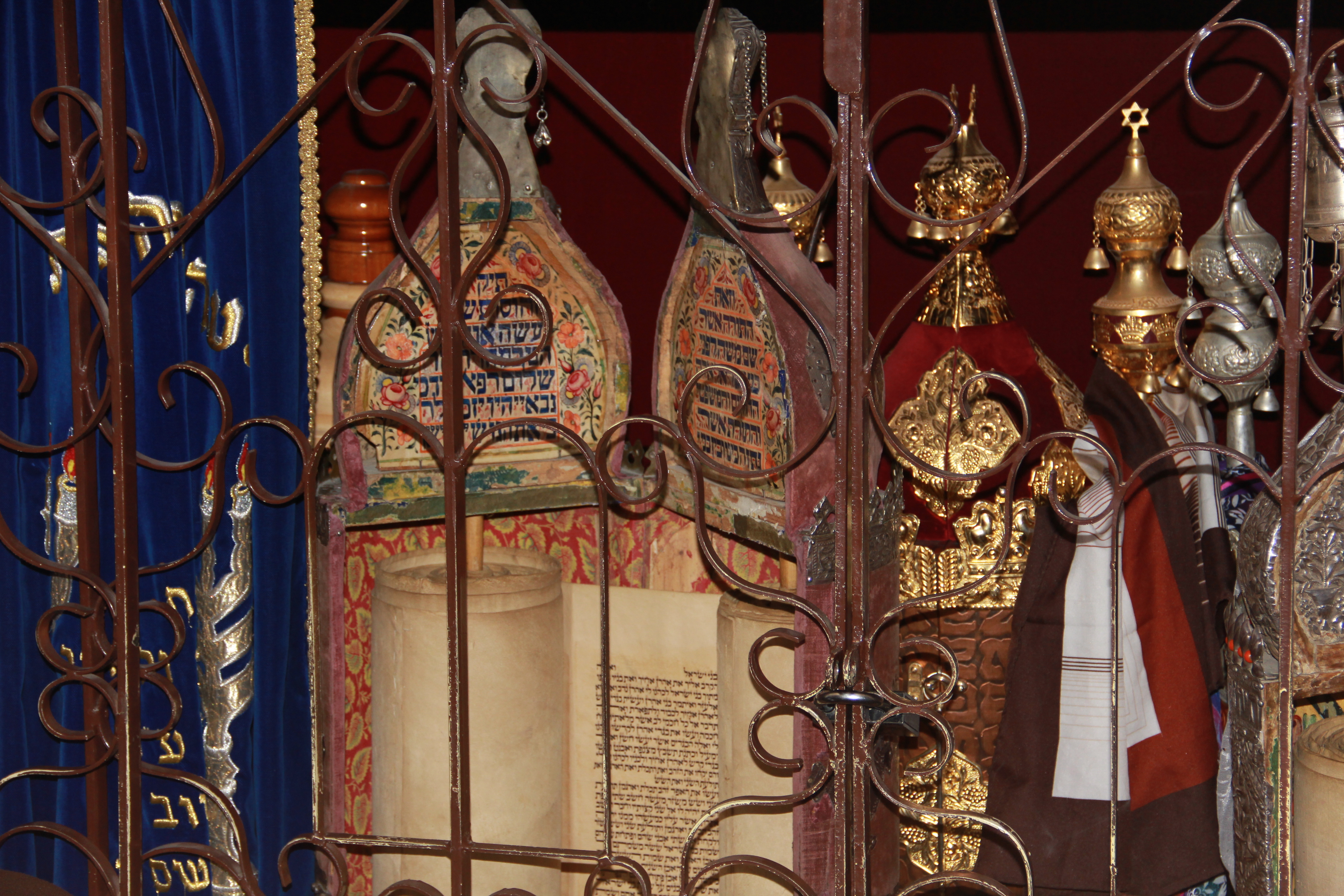
Torah scrolls.

== See also ==
- Ancient synagogues in Palestine
- History of the Jews in Palestine
- List of oldest synagogues
