= Aaron ben Menahem Mendel =

Russian rabbi

Aaron ben Menahem Mendel was a Russian rabbi, who flourished at the beginning of the nineteenth century. He wrote "Seyag la-Torah" (Fence to the Law), which was printed at Lemberg in 1810. This work contains references to all the passages of the Babylonian Talmud quoted in the Tosafot, but is a plagiarism from a similar work by Mordecai Yoffe.
