= 1929 Hebron massacre =

Killing of Jews in Mandatory Palestine

Coordinates: 31°31′43″N 35°05′49″E

- Part of the 1929 Palestine riots
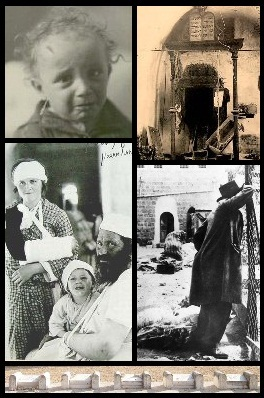
- From top-left, clockwise: Young boy crying from wounds; The Holy Ark of the Sephardi Synagogue of Abraham is ransacked; A survivor reflecting in the aftermath of the massacre; Kolstein family recover from their injuries. Bottom: Memorials to murdered rabbinical students in the old Jewish cemetery.
- Location: Hebron, Mandatory Palestine
- Date: Saturday, 24 August 1929
- Deaths: 67
- Injuries: 58
- Perpetrator: Arabs
- Motive: False rumours that Jews were slaughtering Muslims in Jerusalem and were planning to attack Al-Aqsa

The 1929 Hebron massacre was the killing of 67-69 Jews on 24 August in Hebron, Mandatory Palestine, during the 1929 Palestine riots. Jewish homes were pillaged and synagogues were ransacked, leaving scores seriously wounded or maimed.

The massacre was perpetrated by Palestinian Arabs incited to violence by rumors that Zionist Jews were planning to seize control of the Temple Mount in Jerusalem. Some of the 435 Jews in Hebron who survived were hidden by local Arab families, although the extent of this phenomenon is debated. Soon after, all Hebron's Jews were evacuated by the British authorities, bringing an end to the centuries-old Jewish presence in Hebron. Many returned in 1931, but almost all were evacuated at the outbreak of the 1936–1939 Arab revolt in Palestine.

The massacre, together with another massacre of Jews in Safed, sent shock waves through Jewish communities in Palestine and around the world. It led to the re-organization and development of the Zionist paramilitary organization the Haganah, which later became the nucleus of the Israel Defense Forces.

== Background ==
=== Simmering tensions ===
The city of Hebron holds special significance in Judaism and Islam, it being the site of the Tomb of the Patriarchs. In 1929, the population of the city numbered around 20,000, the majority of whom were Muslim Arabs. A small community of around 700 Jews lived in and around Hebron.

A few dozen Jews lived deep within Hebron, in a kind of ghetto, where there were several synagogues and the Hebron Yeshiva, but the majority rented houses, many built specifically for Jewish tenants, from Arab proprietors on the outskirts. The Jewish community was divided between relatively recent European (Ashkenazi) immigrants and an older population of descendants of Sephardic Jews who had inhabited the town for eight hundred years. Ashkenazi Jews had been established in the town for at least a century. The two communities, Sephardic and Ashkenazi, maintained separate schools, worshipped in separate synagogues, and did not intermarry. The Sephardics were Arabic speakers, wore Arab dress and were well integrated, whereas many of the Ashkenazi community were yeshiva students who maintained 'foreign' ways, and had difficulties and misunderstandings with the Arab population. The tensions between the two Jewish communities, both very traditionalist, were not caused by diverging worldviews, but only by differences of culture and ritual practice.

The progressive trends of the new Western arrivals in Palestine, represented by both foreign powers and modernising Jewish philanthropists and organisations, were a different matter altogether. Since the Balfour Declaration of 1917, tensions had been growing between the Arab and Jewish communities in Palestine. The Muslim community of Hebron had a reputation for being highly conservative in religion. Though Jews had suffered numerous vexations in the past, and this hostility was to take an anti-Zionist turn after the Balfour Declaration, a peaceful relationship existed between both communities. During the riots of 1920 and 1921, Hebron's Jews had been spared the violence that broke out elsewhere. But by 1923, an ongoing series of low-level incidents had persuaded the local Jewish community that the Muslim-Christian association was spreading anti-Jewish hatred, and the Jewish community complained to the local police force that not enough was being done to protect them.

Another key source of tension concerned the status of the Western Wall and al-Aqsa in Jerusalem. The claim that Jews wanted to retake what Jews call the Temple Mount and Muslims call Al-Aqsa and destroy the Muslim structures there had been a persistent theme of Arab propaganda, though as Tom Segev has noted, "[t]he Zionists had no plans to destroy the mosques, and building the Third Temple was not on their agenda". On the other hand, led by Hajj Amin al-Husseini, the mufti of Jerusalem, a campaign had begun in 1928 to reassert Muslim rights over the Western Wall, which was owned by Muslim authorities; al-Husseini ordered new construction in front of and on top of the Wall, and bricks from the construction fell on those who wished to pray there, while excrement from mules befouled the area in front of the Wall. Both sides viewed these developments as symbolically powerful to their respective causes. Jewish leaders appealed to the British authorities to intervene.

When they did not, hundreds of Jewish nationalists marched to the Western Wall on August 14, 1929 while British authorities were on leave, shouting slogans such as "The Wall is Ours" and raising the Jewish national flag. Rumours, apparently part of an organized campaign, spread that Jewish youths had also attacked Arabs and had cursed Muhammad; Husseini's activists handed out fliers that appeared to have been pre-published appealing, with inflammatory religious rhetoric, to Muslims to avenge "the honor of Islam." Following an inflammatory sermon the next day, hundreds of Muslims organized by the Supreme Muslim Council converged on the Western Wall, burning prayer books and injuring the beadle. The rioting soon spread to the Jewish commercial area of town and the next day, August 17, a young Jew was stabbed to death. The authorities failed to quell the violence. On the evening of Thursday, August 22 and early the next morning, Arab villagers armed with sticks and knives gathered at the Haram al-Sharif. During the morning prayers, a nationalist preacher exhorted the Muslim faithful to fight against the Jews until the last drop of blood; gunshots were heard coming from the compound to excite the crowd. Inflamed by rumors that Jews were planning to attack al-Aqsa, Arabs left the compound and were spoken to by Husseini, who was instructed by the British authorities to calm the crowd, but they became more excited. The crowd then began to attack Jews in the Old City of Jerusalem and burn shops.

Segev notes that whether the first victims were Jews or Arabs is a matter of much dispute; Laurens claims that the first murders of the day took place when two or three Arabs passing by the Jewish Quarter of Mea Shearim were killed. Rumours that Jews had massacred Arabs in Jerusalem then reached Hebron by that evening; the first murder, of a Jewish student alone in a yeshiva, occurred that evening.

=== Haganah offers protection ===
Former Haganah member Baruch Katinka recalled that he had been informed by his superiors that 10–12 fighters were needed to protect the Jews in Hebron. On August 20, a group travelled to Hebron in the middle of the night and met with a Jewish community leader, Eliezer Dan Slonim. Katinka said that Slonim was adamant that no protection was needed as he was on good terms with the local Arabs and he trusted the a'yan (Arab notables) to protect the Jews. According to Katinka, Slonim postulated that the sight of the Haganah might instead cause a provocation. The group was soon discovered and Police Superintendent Raymond Cafferata, an officer recruited from the Black and Tans, ordered them to return to Jerusalem. Two others remained in Slonim's house, but the day after, they too returned to Jerusalem as requested by Slonim.

=== Hebron police force ===
Hebron's police force was headed by Superintendent Raymond Cafferata of the Palestine Police Force and consisted of two Arab officers and another 40 policemen, only one of whom was Jewish. A number of the force were elderly and in a poor physical condition. Cafferata was later to explain that it was impossible to keep the situation under control, as he was the only British officer stationed in the town, and the reinforcements he had sent for never arrived. The Hebron police were greatly relieved, on the morning of the 24th, to note that a contingent of armed Arab locals had departed the city to lend strength to forces in Jerusalem. At the same time however, many peasants from surrounding villages began to flow into Hebron.

== Prelude ==
On Friday, August 23, after hearing reports of rioting in Jerusalem in the afternoon, a crowd of 700 Arabs gathered at the city's central bus station intending to travel to Jerusalem. Cafferata attempted to placate them, and as a precaution, asked the British authorities to send reinforcements to Hebron. He then arranged for a mounted patrol to be sent to the Jewish quarter, where he encountered Rabbi Yaakov Yosef Slonim who asked for police protection after Jews had been attacked with stones. Cafferata instructed the Jews to stay in their homes while he tried to disperse the crowds. Jewish newspaper accounts carried various claims by survivors that they had heard Arab threats to "divvy up [Jewish] women", Arab homeowners had told their Jewish neighbours "today will be the great slaughter", and several of the victims took tea with so-called friends who, in the afternoon, became their killers.

At around 4:00 pm, stones were thrown through the windows of Jewish homes. The Hebron Yeshiva was hit, and as a student tried to escape the building, he was set upon by the mob, which stabbed him to death. The sexton, the only other person in the building at the time, survived by hiding in a well. Some hours later Cafferata attempted to get the local mukhtars to assume responsibility for law and order, but they told him that the Mufti of Jerusalem Hajj Amin al-Husseini had told them to take action or be fined because of the 'Jewish slaughter of Arabs' in Jerusalem. Cafferata told them to return to their villages but, expecting some disturbances, he slept in his office that night.

== Attack ==
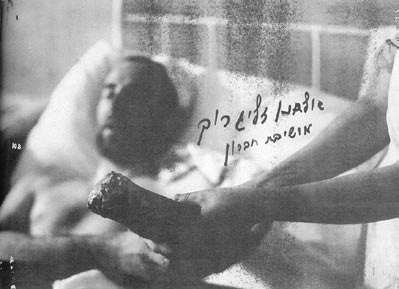
Elhanan Zelig Roch, a student of the Hebron Yeshiva, lost a hand in the attack

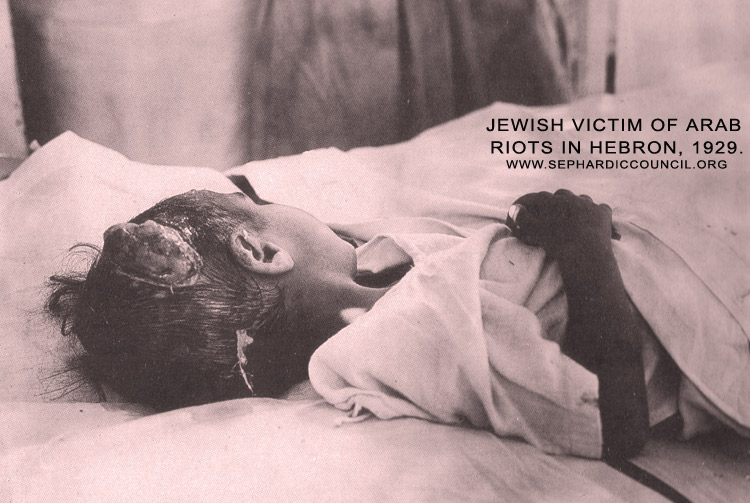
Jewish child victim of Arab riots

=== Rampage and killing ===
At about 8.30 am Saturday morning, the first attacks began to be launched against houses where Jews resided, after a crowd of Arabs armed with staves, axes and knives appeared in the streets. The first location to be attacked was a large Jewish residence on the main road. Two young boys were immediately killed, and the mob entered the house and beat or stabbed the other occupants to death.

Cafferata appeared on the scene, gave orders to his constables to fire on the crowd and personally shot dead two of the attacking Arabs. While some dispersed, the rest managed to break through the pickets, shouting "on to the ghetto!" The requested reinforcements had not arrived in time. That later became the source of considerable acrimony.

According to a survivor, Aharon Reuven Bernzweig, "right after eight o'clock in the morning we heard screams. Arabs had begun breaking into Jewish homes. The screams pierced the heart of the heavens. We didn't know what to do.... They were going from door to door, slaughtering everyone who was inside. The screams and the moans were terrible. People were crying Help! Help! But what could we do?"

Soon after news of the first victim had spread, forty people assembled in the house of Eliezer Dan Slonim. Slonim, the son of the Rabbi of Hebron, was a member on the city council and a director of the Anglo-Palestine Bank. He had excellent relations with the British and the Arabs and those seeking refuge with him were confident they would come to no harm. When the mob approached his door, they offered to spare the Sephardi community if he would hand over all the Ashkenazi yeshiva students. He refused, saying "we are all one people", and he was shot dead along with his wife and 4-year-old son. From the contemporary Hebrew press it appears that the rioters targeted the Zionist community for their massacre. Four-fifths of the victims were Ashkenazi Jews, but some had deep roots in the town, yet a dozen Jews of eastern origin, Sephardics and Maghrebian, were also killed. Gershon Ben-Zion, for example, the Beit Hadassah Clinic pharmacist, a cripple who had served both Jews and Arabs for 4 decades, was killed together with his family: his daughter was raped and then murdered.

==== Account of Raymond Cafferata ====
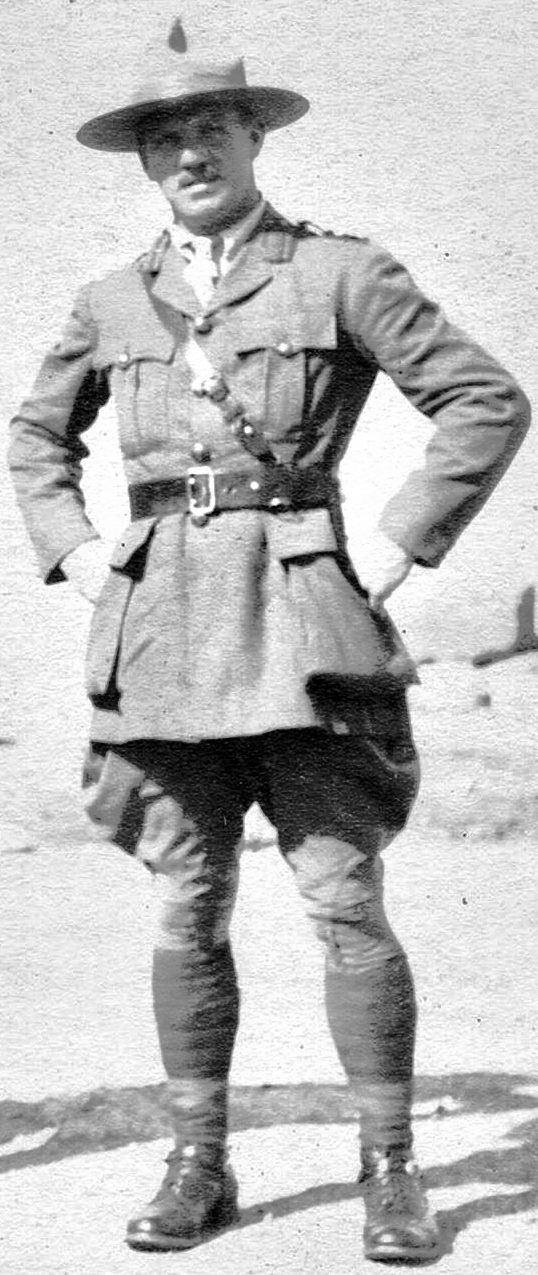
Raymond Cafferata about 1926

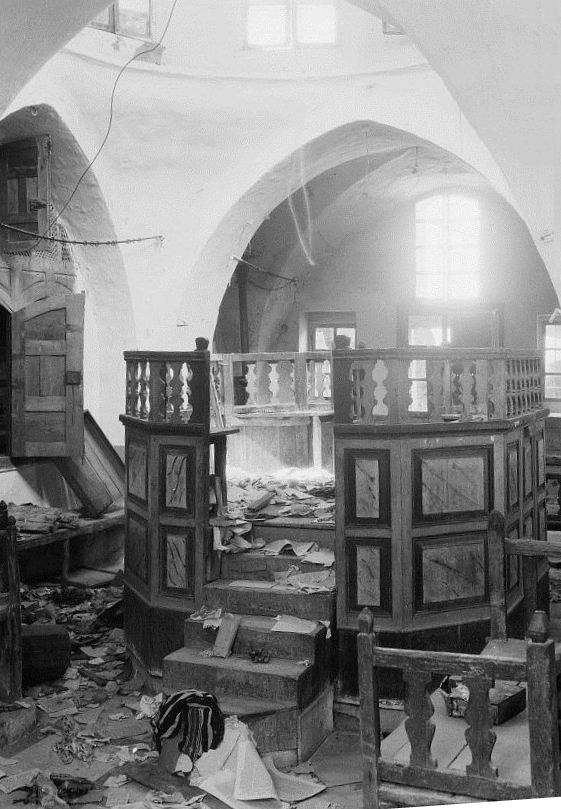
Avraham Avinu Synagogue desecrated during the riots

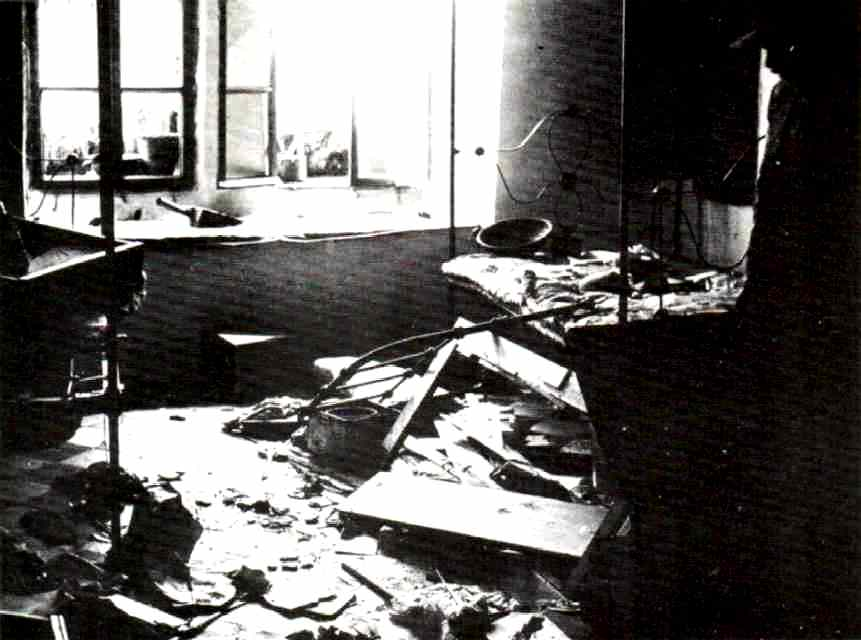
A ransacked house in the Jewish quarter of Hebron

After the massacre, Cafferata testified:

On hearing screams in a room, I went up a sort of tunnel passage and saw an Arab in the act of cutting off a child's head with a sword. He had already hit him and was having another cut, but on seeing me he tried to aim the stroke at me, but missed; he was practically on the muzzle of my rifle. I shot him low in the groin. Behind him was a Jewish woman smothered in blood with a man I recognized as a[n Arab] police constable named Issa Sheriff from Jaffa. He was standing over the woman with a dagger in his hand. He saw me and bolted into a room close by and tried to shut me out-shouting in Arabic, "Your Honor, I am a policeman." ... I got into the room and shot him.

==== Account of Jacob Joseph Slonim ====
Rabbi Jacob Joseph Slonim, the Ashkenazi chief rabbi of Hebron, stated that after his Arab acquaintances had informed him that local hooligans intended to attack the talmudical academy, he had gone to ask for protection from District Officer Abdullah Kardus, but was denied an audience with him. Later on after being attacked in the street, he had approached the chief of police, but Cafferata refused to take any measures, telling him that "the Jews deserve it, you are the cause of all troubles." The next morning, Slonim again urged the District Officer to take preventative measures, but he was told there was "no ground for fear. A great number of police is available. Go and reassure the Jewish population." Two hours later, a mob incited by speeches started breaking into Jewish homes with cries of "Kill the Jews." The massacre lasted an hour and a half, and only after it had died down, did the police take action, firing shots into the air, whereupon the crowds immediately dispersed. Slonim himself was saved by a friendly Arab.

=== Looting, destruction and desecration ===
The attack was accompanied by wanton destruction and looting. A Jewish hospital, which had provided treatment for Arabs, was attacked and ransacked. Numerous Jewish synagogues were vandalised and desecrated. According to one account, Torah scrolls in casings of silver and gold were looted from the synagogues and manuscripts of great antiquity were pilfered from the library of Rabbi Judah Bibas. The library, founded in 1852, was partly burned and destroyed. In one instance, a rabbi who had saved a Torah scroll from a blazing synagogue later died from his burns.

=== Arabs shelter Jews ===
One estimate puts the number of survivors who were saved in this way as two thirds of the community. Another states that half were thus rescued, with 28 Arab homes offering sanctuary. The original lists underwritten by rabbis Meir and Slonim attested to 19 rescuer families, which is believed to underestimate the number. Modern historical figures vary.

Aharon Reuven Bernzweig related that an Arab named Haj Eissa El Kourdieh saved a group of 33 Jews after he insisted they hide in his cellar. There they waited with a "deadly fear" for the trouble to pass, worrying that the "murderers outside would hear [the little children who kept crying]." From the cellar, they heard cries of "today is a day that is holy to Mohammed. Anyone who does not kill Jews is a sinner." Meanwhile, several Arab women stood guard outside, repeatedly challenging the claims of the screaming mob that they were sheltering Jews. Yonah Molchadsky gave birth while taking refuge in an Arab basement. Molchadsky later related that when the mob demanded for the Arabs to give up any Jews they were hiding, her host told them "we have already killed our Jews," whereupon the mob departed. The family of Abu Id Zaitoun rescued Zmira Mani and other Jews by hiding them in their cellar and protecting them with their swords. They later found a policeman to escort them safely to the police station at Beit Romano.

According to Malka Slonim, an aged Arab called Abu Shaker defended them:

We sat silently in the sealed house and Abu-Shaker reported what was happening ... The rioters had arrived. We heard them growling cries of murder ... We also heard the voice of Abu-Shaker: "Get out of here! You won't enter here! You won't enter here!" They pushed him. He was old, maybe 75 years old, but he had a strong body. He struggled. He lay in front of the entrance to the home, by the door, and cried out. "Only over my dead body will you pass through here! Over my corpse!" One rioter wielded his knife over Abu-Shaker and yelled. "I will kill you, traitor!" The knife struck him. Abu-Shaker's leg was cut. His blood was spilt. He did not emit any groans of pain. He did not shout, he only said, "Go and cut! I am not moving!" The rioters consulted with each other: there was a moment of silence. Later we heard them leaving. We knew we had been saved. We wanted to bring our savior inside and bandage his wound and thank him. He refused and said that others might arrive and that his task has not ended yet.

Musa Agima, whose father had a slaughterhouse in Hebron, testified that they were saved by one of his father's Arab employees who brought donkeys and got the family mounted and led them to Jerusalem.

=== Survivors ===
Around 435 Jews, or two-thirds of the community, survived. Most were reportedly saved by Arab families, and around 130 saved themselves by hiding or by taking refuge in the British police station at Beit Romano on the outskirts of the city. Israeli historian Benny Morris has challenged traditional accounts that most survivors were saved by Arab families. He wrote, that "in fact, most were rescued by British police intervention and by the fact that many Jews successfully fended off their assailants for long hours – though to be sure, Arab neighbors did save several families". The survivors who had been rescued by the British police were evacuated to Jerusalem.

== Aftermath ==
=== Numbers killed and injured ===
Jewish boys wounded by rioting in Hebron

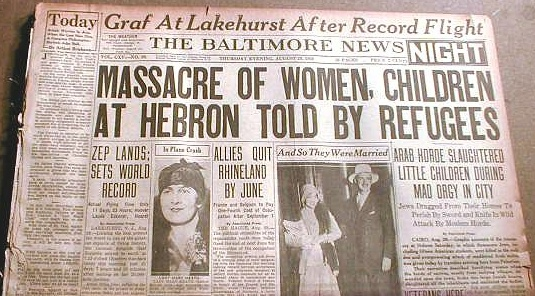
The Baltimore News header reads: "Massacre of women, children at Hebron told by refugees"

In total, 67 Jews and 9 Arabs were killed. Of the Jews killed, 59 died during the rioting and 8 more later succumbed to their wounds. They included a dozen women and three children under the age of five. Twenty-four of the victims were students from the Hebron yeshiva, seven of whom were American or Canadian. The bodies of 57 Jewish victims were buried in mass graves by Arabs, without regard to Jewish burial ritual. Most of the murdered Jews were of Ashkenazi descent, while 12 were Sephardi. 58 are thought to have been injured, including many women and children. One estimate put the figure at 49 seriously and 17 slightly wounded. A letter from the Jews of Hebron to the High Commissioner described cases of torture, mutilation and rape. Eighteen days after the massacre, the Jewish leadership requested that bodies be exhumed to ascertain whether deliberate mutilation had taken place. But after 20 bodies had been disinterred and reburied, it was decided to discontinue. The bodies had been exposed for two days before burial and it was almost impossible to ascertain whether or not they had been subject to mutilations after or during the massacre. No conclusions could therefore be made.

=== Reaction and response ===
==== Commission of enquiry ====
The Shaw Commission was a British enquiry that investigated the violent rioting in Palestine in late August 1929. It described the massacre at Hebron:

About 9 o'clock on the morning of the 24th of August, Arabs in Hebron made a most ferocious attack on the Jewish ghetto and on isolated Jewish houses lying outside the crowded quarters of the town. More than 60 Jews – including many women and children – were murdered and more than 50 were wounded. This savage attack, of which no condemnation could be too severe, was accompanied by wanton destruction and looting. Jewish synagogues were desecrated, a Jewish hospital, which had provided treatment for Arabs, was attacked and ransacked, and only the exceptional personal courage displayed by Mr. Cafferata – the one British Police Officer in the town – prevented the outbreak from developing into a general massacre of the Jews in Hebron.

Cafferata testified to the Commission of Enquiry in Jerusalem on 7 November. The Times reported Cafferata's evidence to the Commission that "until the arrival of British police it was impossible to do more than keep the living Jews in the hospital safe and the streets clear [because he] was the only British officer or man in Hebron, a town of 20,000".

On September 1, Sir John Chancellor, British High Commissioner for the Mandate of Palestine, condemned:

I have learned with horror of the atrocious acts committed by bodies of ruthless and bloodthirsty evildoers, of savage murders perpetrated upon defenseless members of the Jewish population regardless of age or sex, accompanied as at Hebron, by acts of unspeakable savagery.

After his return from abroad, Chancellor visited Hebron and described that "The horror of it is beyond words. In one of the houses I visited not less than twenty five Jews men & women were murdered in cold blood."

==== Trials and convictions ====
Sheik Taleb Markah was charged with being one of the chief instigators of the Hebron massacre. In giving its verdict, the judge said that the evidence tended to show not that the prisoner had incited the Arabs of Hebron to murder the Jews of Hebron but that he had incited them to attack the Jews of Jerusalem. He was fined and sentenced to two years imprisonment. Two of the four Arabs charged with the murder of 24 Jews in the house of Rabbi Jacob Slonim were sentenced to death.

In Palestine overall, 195 Arabs and 34 Jews were sentenced by the courts for crimes related to the 1929 riots. Death sentences were handed down to 17 Arabs and two Jews, but these were later commuted to long prison terms except in the case of three Arabs who were hanged. Large fines were imposed on 22 Arab villages or urban neighborhoods. The fine imposed on Hebron was 14,000 pounds. Financial compensation totaling about 200,000 pounds was paid to persons who lost family members or property.

=== Decline of Jewish community ===
Some Hebron Arabs, amongst whom the President of Hebron's Chamber of Commerce, Ahmad Rashid al-Hirbawi, favoured the return of Jews to the town. The returning Jews quarrelled with the Jewish Agency over funding. The Agency did not agree to the idea of reconstituting a mixed community, but rather pressed for the establishment of a Jewish fortress wholly distinct from the Arab quarters of Hebron. The Palestine Emergency Fund had raised $2.5 million from donors worldwide in the months after the massacre to construct a separate, better-protected Jewish community near Hebron, though the plans fell through after few refugees were willing to return to a "city of horror". In the spring of 1931, 160 Jews returned together with Rabbi Chaim Bagaio. At the start of the 1936–1939 Arab revolt in Palestine they all left the town for good, except for one family, that of Yaakov Ben Shalomn Ezra, an eighth generation Hebronite who was a dairyman, who eventually left in 1947, on the eve of the 1948 Palestine war.

==== Yeshiva relocates to Jerusalem ====
After the massacre, the remainder of the Hebron yeshiva relocated to Jerusalem.

=== Jewish re-settlement after 1967 ===
During the 1967 Six-Day War, Israel occupied Hebron when it captured the West Bank from Jordan. Residents, terrified that Israeli soldiers might massacre them in retaliation for the events of 1929, waved white flags from their homes and voluntarily turned in their weapons. Subsequently, Israelis settled in Hebron as part of Israel's settlement program, and the Committee of the Jewish Community of Hebron was established as the municipal body of the settlers. Today, about 500–800 Israelis live in the city's old quarter. The Israeli military controls about 20% of Hebron to protect the settlers, with the rest of the city falling under Palestinian Authority rule. Most Jewish settlers in the area live outside the municipality of Hebron, in the adjacent town of Kiryat Arba.

Descendants of the original Jewish community of Hebron are divided, with some claiming they wish to return, but only when Arab and Jewish residents can find a way to live together peacefully. In 1996, 37 descendants of the pre-1929 community of Hebron, including seven members of the Slonim family, published a statement repudiating the new Hebron settlers, writing that "these settlers are alien to the way of life of the Hebron Jews, who created over the generations a culture of peace and understanding between peoples and faiths in the city". Other survivors and descendants of survivors support the new Jewish community in Hebron.

== Legacy ==
In the metanarrative of Zionism, according to Michelle Campos, the event became 'a central symbol of Jewish persecution at the hands of bloodthirsty Arabs' and was 'engraved in the national psyche of Israeli Jews', particularly those who settled in Hebron after 1967. Hillel Cohen regards the massacre as marking a point-of-no-return in Arab–Jewish relations, and forcing the Mizrahi Jews to join forces with Zionism.

=== In popular culture ===
Noit Geva, daughter of a survivor, discovered that her grandmother, Zemira Mani (who was the granddaughter of Hebron's chief Sephardic rabbi, Eliyahu Mani), had written an account of the massacre, published in the Haaretz newspaper in 1929. In 1999 Geva released a film containing testimonies of 13 survivors that she and her husband Dan had managed to track down from the list in Sefer Hebron ("The Book of Hebron").

In the film, What I Saw in Hebron the survivors – now very elderly – describe pre-massacre Hebron as a kind of paradise surrounded by vineyards, where Sephardic Jews and Arabs lived in idyllic coexistence. The well-established Ashkenazi residents were also treated well, but the Arabs' anger was roused by followers of the Jerusalem Mufti as well as local chapters of the (Arab) Muslim-Christian Societies.

Originally intended to document the story of the Arab who had saved Geva's mother from other Arabs, it became also an account of the atrocities of the massacre itself. These survivors, most of whom no longer live in Israel, are mixed as to whether they can forgive. According to Asher Meshorer (Zemira Mani's son and Noit Geva's father), his aunt (Zemira Mani's sister, who was not present in Hebron during the massacre) had told him that the Arabs from the villages essentially wanted to kill only the new Ashkenazim. According to her, there was an alienated Jewish community that wore streimels, unlike the Sephardi community, which was deeply rooted, speaking Arabic and dressing like Arab residents. The Mani family was saved by an Arab neighbour, Abu 'Id Zeitun, who was accompanied by his brother and son. In 1999, according to Abu 'Id Zeitun, the house in which the Jews were hidden, his father's house, had been confiscated by the IDF, and today, it houses a kindergarten for the settlers.

== See also ==
- List of killings and massacres in Mandatory Palestine
- 1920 Palestine riots
- Jaffa riots 1920
- 1938 Tiberias massacre
- Shaw Report
- Beit HaShalom
- Palestinian political violence
- Israeli–Palestinian conflict in Hebron
- Farhud
- Hope Simpson Enquiry
- History of the Jews in Hebron

== Bibliography ==
- "Eye Witnesses Describe Horrors of the Moslem Arabs' Attacks at Hebron on Saturday, August 24". Jewish Telegraphic Agency. 1929-09-01.
- "Exhume Bodies of Jewish Victims of Hebron Massacre". Jewish Telegraphic Agency. September 12, 1929.
- "Exhumation of Bodies of Hebron Victims Discontinued". Jewish Telegraphic Agency. September 13, 1929.
- "Sheik Takes Stand in Own Defense in Trial for Instigating Hebron Massacre". Jewish Telegraphic Agency. October 20, 1929.
- "Sheik Gets Two Years Prison As Instigator of Hebron Massacre". Jewish Telegraphic Agency. October 25, 1929.
- "Two Arabs Sentenced to Death for Murders of 24 in Slonim House". Jewish Telegraphic Agency. May 18, 1930.
- Laurens, Henry (2002). La Question de Palestine: Une mission sacrée de civilisation. Fayard. ISBN 978-2213612515.
- Morris, Benny (2001). Righteous Victims: A History of the Zionist-Arab Conflict, 1881–1998. Knopf Doubleday. ISBN 0679744754.
- Rubinstein, Amnon (2000). From Herzl to Rabin: the changing image of Zionism. Holmes & Meier.
- Segev, Tom (2000). One Palestine, Complete. Henry Holt and Company.
- Schwartz, Yardena (October 2024). Ghosts of a Holy War: The 1929 Massacre in Palestine That Ignited the Arab-Israeli Conflict. Union Square & Company. ISBN 978-1454949213.
- Shaw Commission: Shaw, Walter; Bettington, Henry; Hopkin Morris, R.; Snell, H. (1930). Report of the Commission on the Palestine Disturbances of August 1929. HMSO. Command paper Cmd. 3530.
- Zeitlin, Solomon (October 1952). "The Hebron Pogrom and the Hebrew Scrolls". The Jewish Quarterly Review. 43 (2): 140–152. doi:10.2307/1452876. JSTOR 1452876.
- Zeitlin, Solomon (1956). "The Dead Sea scrolls and modern scholarship". Jewish Quarterly Review. Monograph series (3). Philadelphia: Dropsie College for Hebrew and Cognate Learning.
