= Malkiel Ashkenazi =

16th-century Sephardic rabbi and leader

- מלכיאל אשכנזי

Personal life
- Died: Hebron, Ottoman Empire
- Notable work: Editing the works of Rabbi Chaim Vital
- Known for: Founding the Avraham Avinu Synagogue
- Occupation: Rabbi

Religious life
- Religion: Judaism

Malkiel (also spelled Malchiel) Ashkenazi (Hebrew: מלכיאל אשכנזי) was a Sephardic rabbi and leader of the Jewish community in Hebron in 1540. He emigrated from Salonika to the Land of Israel, living in Safed before moving to Hebron.

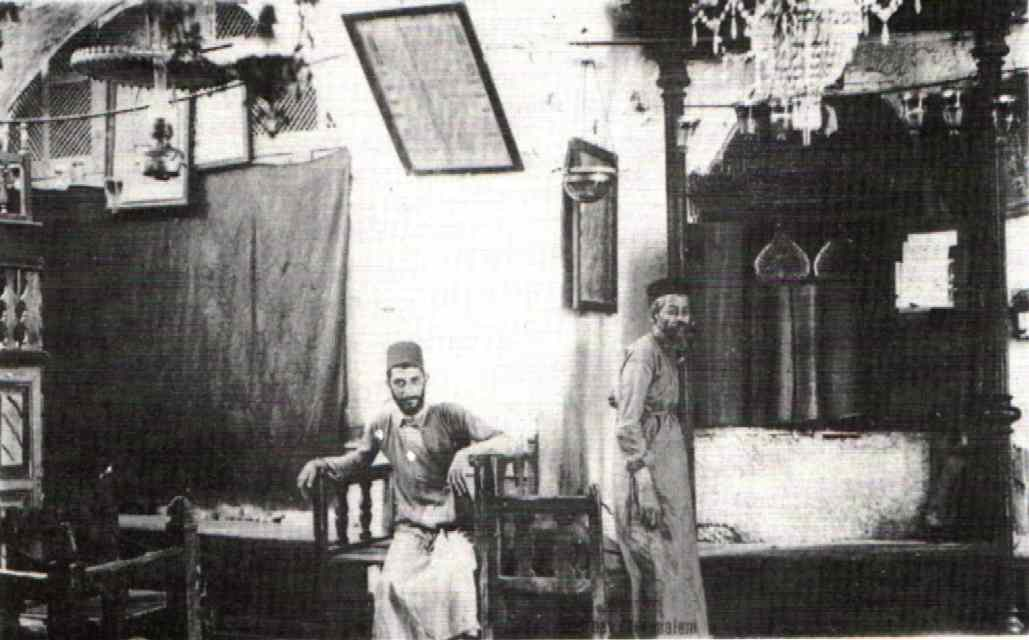
Avraham Avinu Synagogue, 1925

The story of his leading a community in Hebron has its root in 1517, when the Ottoman Turks invaded and Sephardic Jews living in Ottoman Salonika were allowed to move to the Holy Land. Many of these Jews had been expelled from Spain in 1492. It was this community that Rabbi Ashkenazi led when he purchased a walled compound in Hebron in 1540 and founded the Avraham Avinu Synagogue which became a center of study for Kabbalah. He was a respected authority in Jewish law, and his decisions on religious matters were widely accepted, also outside of Hebron. He had an extensive library and helped edit the works of Rabbi Chaim Vital. Rabbi Ashkenazi was buried in the ancient Jewish cemetery in Hebron.
