= History of the Jews in Hebron =

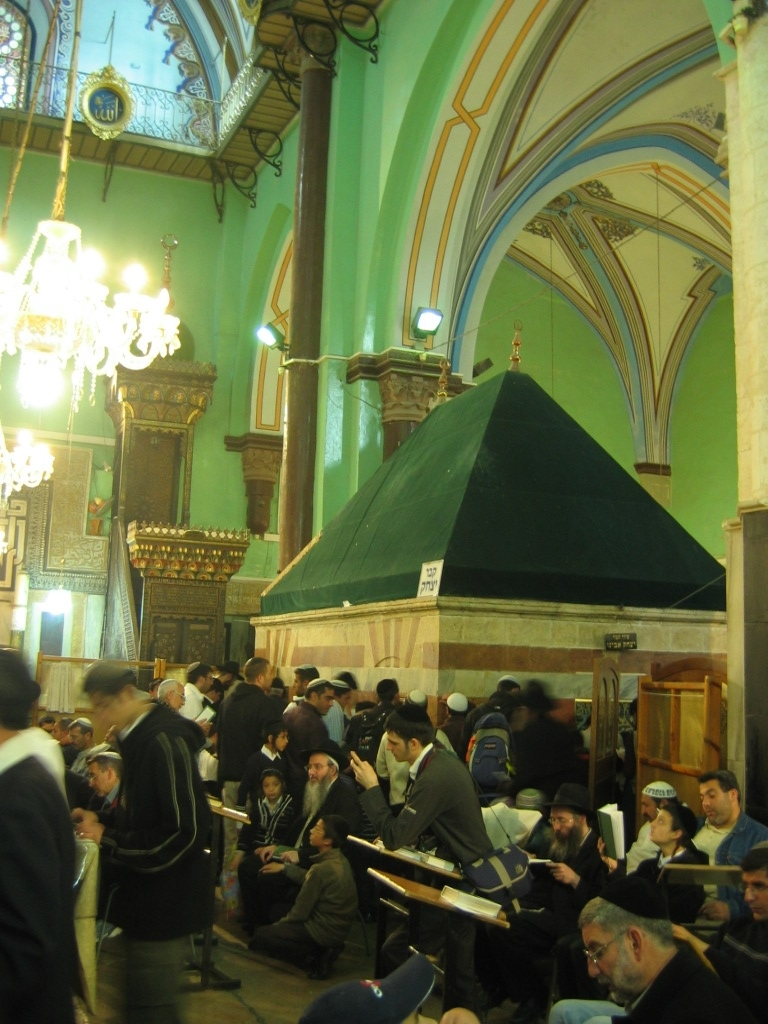
Jewish faithful praying at the tombs of Rebecca and Isaac

According to the Bible, the Jewish prophet Abraham settled in Hebron and purchased the Cave of the Patriarchs as a burial place for his wife Sarah. The biblical tradition asserts that the cave is the final resting site for Abraham, Isaac, Jacob, and their wives—Sarah, Rebecca, and Leah. Hebron is also mentioned as David's first capital, where he was anointed king of Israel. Archaeological findings from Hezekiah's time indicate Hebron's importance in the Kingdom of Judah. During the Second Temple period, Hebron, initially Edomite, underwent a significant shift as its population embraced Judaism under Hasmonean rule. The city was destroyed during the Jewish–Roman wars.

In the 16th century, under Ottoman rule, Jews from Spain established a community in Hebron and built the Abraham Avinu Synagogue. In the 19th century, the community expanded to include Ashkenazi Jews. In the summer of 1929, local Muslims carried out a massacre of the Jews of Hebron. The survivors were initially evacuated by British Mandate forces, then later allowed back. With the outbreak of the Arab Revolt in 1936, the last Jews were evacuated from the city by the British a second time, with only one family remaining.

Shortly after the Six-Day War, Jewish settlement in the city was renewed, along with the establishment of Kiryat Arba nearby. The presence of a Jewish neighborhood in Hebron was explicitly set out in the Hebron Accord, jointly signed by Israel and the Palestinians. At present, this is the only Jewish community located inside a Palestinian city. Today, some 1,100 Jews live in Hebron, including 350 students of the Yeshiva Shavei Hebron (website here), all in the H2 area under Israeli control. Approximately 40,000 Palestinians also live in the H2 area (in addition to 215,000 in H1, the Palestinian part of Hebron.

== History ==
=== Biblical period ===
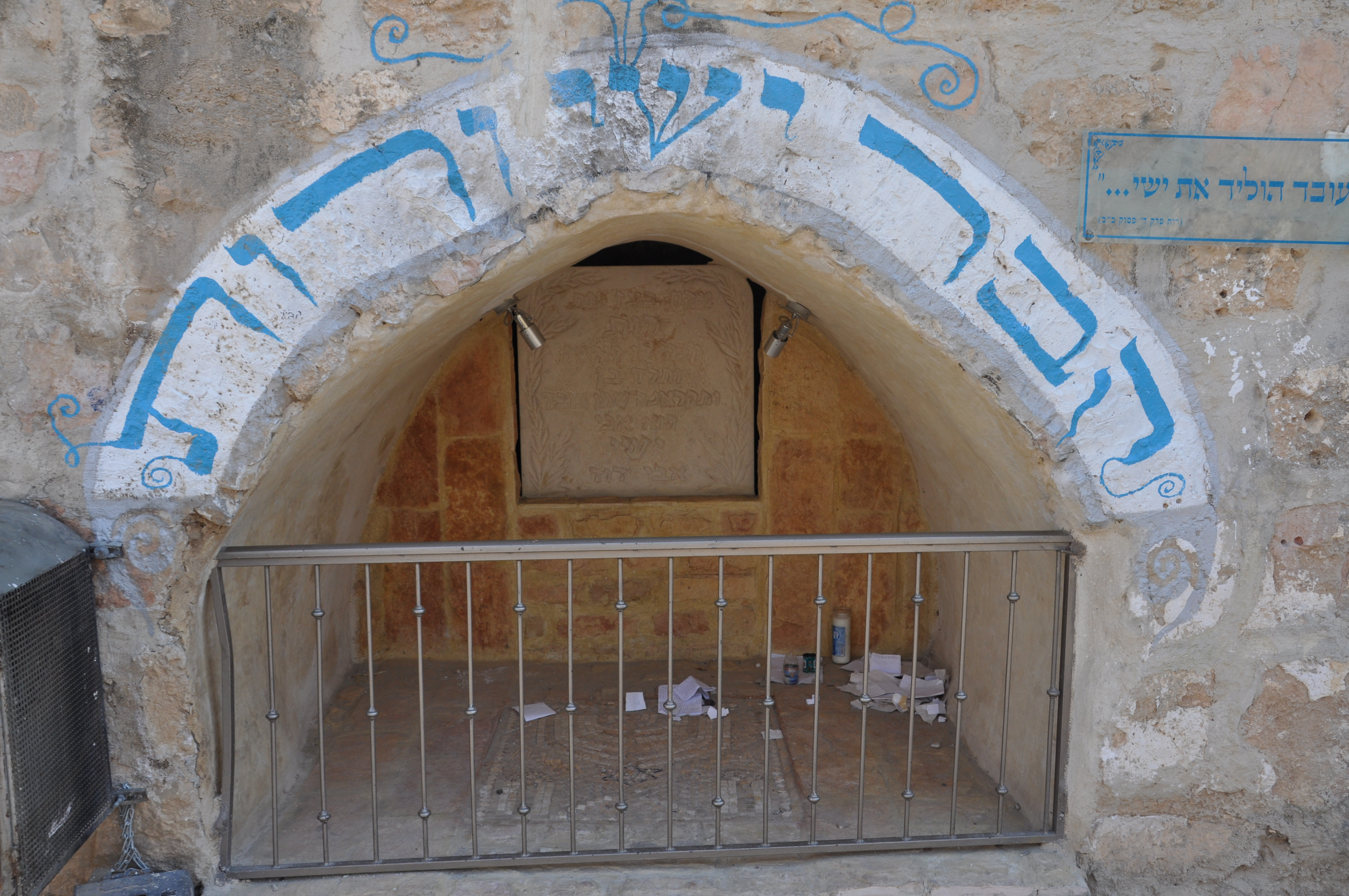
Tomb of Jesse and Ruth

According to biblical tradition, Abraham lived in Hebron. He purchased the Cave of the Patriarchs (Me'arat HaMachpela) and the surrounding field from Ephron the Hittite. Abraham buried his wife Sarah there and was later buried there himself, followed by Isaac and Rebecca, and Jacob and Leah. Isaac also established his residence in Hebron, hence the city is known as the "City of the Patriarchs."

After the Exodus from Egypt, The Twelve Spies arrived in Hebron, where Ahiman, Sheshai, and Talmai, the Anakim (giants), lived at that time. The city was conquered by Joshua during his battle against the five Amorite kings of the south. The king of Hebron was Hoham. The biblical narratives states that the city was completely destroyed, leaving no living soul. As was part of the inheritance of the tribe of Judah, Hebron was awarded to Caleb son of Jephunneh. However, being one of the Levite cities of refuge, it was shared by Caleb and the priests who won the city by lot.

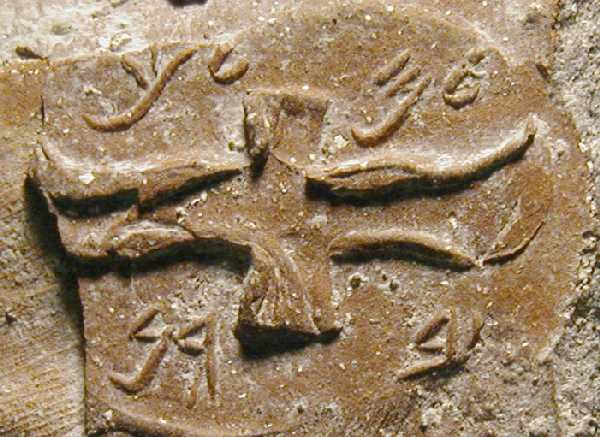
LMLK seal, stamped by the government of Hezekiah, king of Judah, mentioning Hebron (below, in the Paleo-Hebrew script)

David was anointed king and established his first capital in Hebron. He reigned for seven years until the conquest of Jerusalem from the Jebusites, at which point Jerusalem was declared the capital of Israel.

The importance of Hebron during the Kingdom of Judah is evident from the clay jar handles found there, stamped with "for the king" and "Hebron". These seals date back to the reign of Hezekiah, King of Judah, in the 8th to 9th century BCE. Over 1,200 jar handles with the royal seal, reading "for the king," were discovered. It is believed the jars contained oil and wine for royal use.

According to the Book of Kings, Shishak, the first king of Egypt, conquered Jerusalem in 926 BCE. An inscription found in Karnak, Egypt, lists among the cities he conquered "Field of Abraham," possibly referring to Hebron.

=== Second Temple period ===
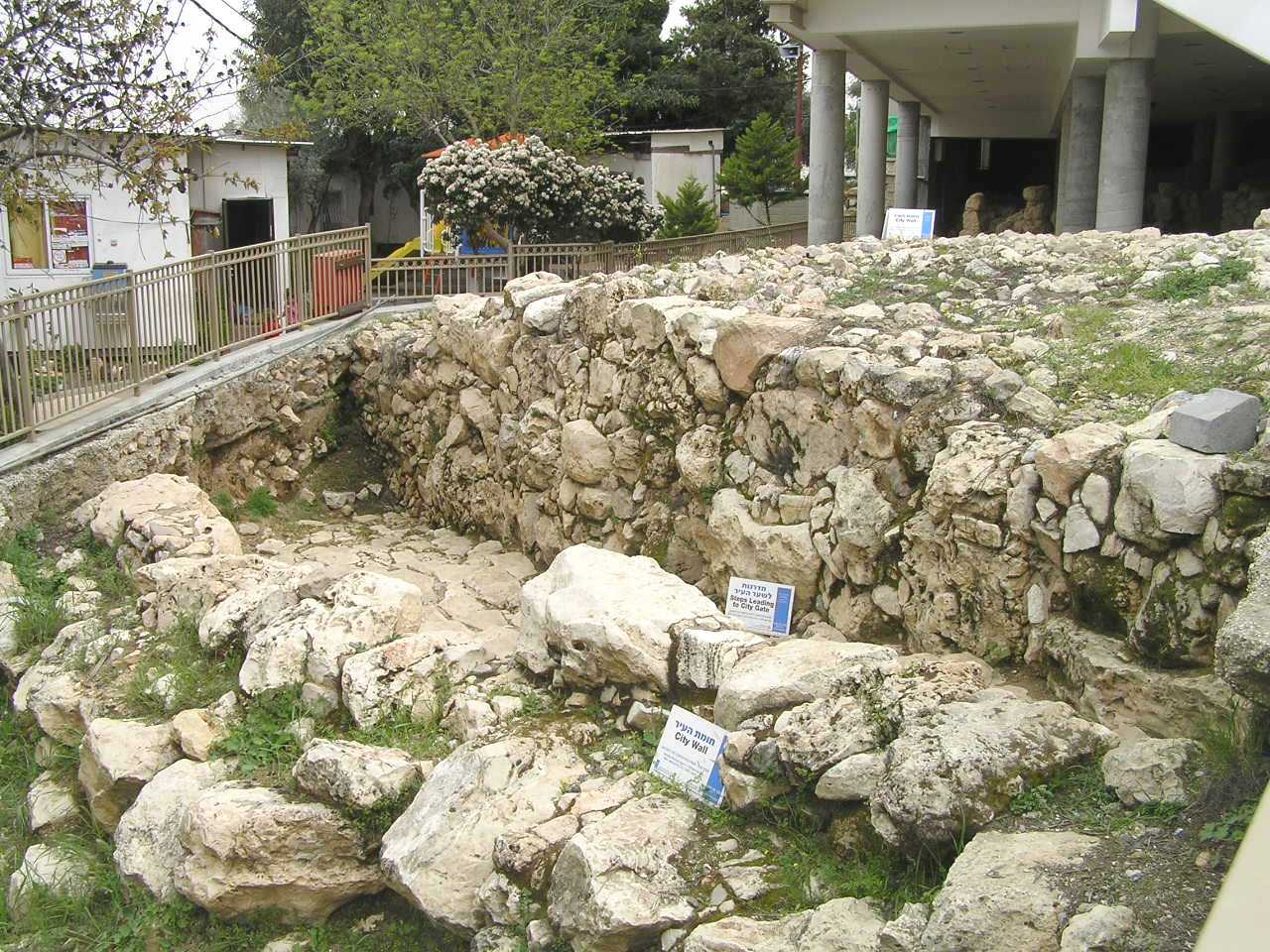
Excavations at Tel Hebron. Here was the Jewish settlement in Hebron during the Second Temple period

When Jewish exiles from Babylon returned to the Land of Israel with Ezra and Nehemiah, settlement in Hebron and surroundings was renewed. The inhabitants of the city were among those asked to send one in ten to Jerusalem to assist in its rehabilitation. However, it is assumed that the Edomites migrated to the southern part of Mount Hebron, which was empty of Jews, perhaps due to the pressure of the Nabatean tribes on their ancient land east of the Jordan. The Edomites also took control of most of the area up to Beth-zur.

In 164 BCE, Hebron was conquered by Judas Maccabeus who destroyed the city and its fortifications. In 112 BCE, the Hasmonean prince John Hyrcanus I waged war against the Edomites, who were given the choice of expulsion or conversion. Thus, Hebron became a Jewish city, with a population that included former Edomites. During the Great Jewish Revolt against the Romans (66–70 CE), one of the rebel leaders, Simon Bar Giora, established an alliance with a former Edomite leader and the area was handed over to him. However, it was conquered soon after and burned down by the Romans. Many Jewish captives were sold into slavery in the Hebron marketplace. After the Great Revolt, Hebron became a small town known as "Abramium."

=== Late Antiquity and Medieval period ===
Jewish settlement in Hebron was sparse during this period. In the Byzantine period, when a church was built over the Cave of the Patriarchs, the authorities allowed the Jews to pray in one part of it. A synagogue was established near the entrance to the Cave, but it was converted into a church after the Crusader conquest, and the Jews were driven out.

The Makhamra family, a Palestinian Muslim clan based in Yatta, may trace its lineage back to Jewish ancestors who fled Hebron during the Crusades.

In 1211, Rabbi Samuel ben Samson reported finding one Jewish dyer in the city. In 1481, Rabbi Meshullam of Volterra described a visit to Hebron in his travelogue "Meshullam's Journey in the Land of Israel." He visited the Cave of the Patriarchs with the "guardian of the cave" and made a sketch of it. He found 20 Jewish families living in the city at that time. When Rabbi Moses Basola's visited in 1521, he also found 20 Jewish families.

In the 15th century, Jewish refugees from Venice who worked in the glass industry arrived in Hebron. During the Mamluk period, Hebron was named one of the Four Holy Cities. The ancient city hill, known as the "Kasbah," was abandoned at this time and a Jewish quarter established by Jews expelled from Spain grew up to the west of the Cave of Patriarchs, along the route of a water conduit. The land on which the Jewish quarter was built was purchased from the Arabs.

In 1517, in the final phases of the Ottoman-Mamluk War, following the Mamluk defeat of the Turks, the Jews of Hebron were violently attacked and their property was looted. Those who survived fled to Beirut.

Many Hebron Jews fled to Gaza in 1525, in the wake of a plague epidemic.

=== Ottoman period ===
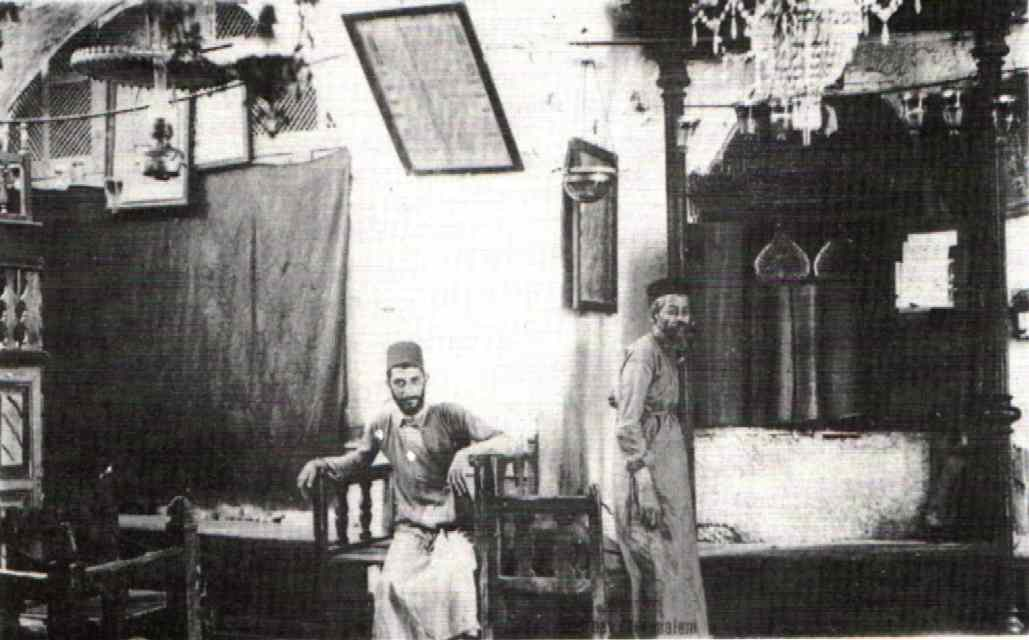
Abraham Avinu Synagogue, built by Sephardic Jews led by Malkiel Ashkenazi in 1540, 1925

==== Early Ottoman period ====
During the Ottoman period (1516–1917), Jews from all over the Middle East settled in Hebron, which became a center of Jewish learning. In 1540, Rabbi Malkiel Ashkenazi bought property from the Karaites who had lived there since the 10th century, creating what became known as the Jewish courtyard. Here he established the Avraham Avinu Synagogue, which was destroyed during the 1929 Hebron massacre, razed under Jordanian rule after 1948, and rebuilt after the renewal of Jewish settlement in 1967.

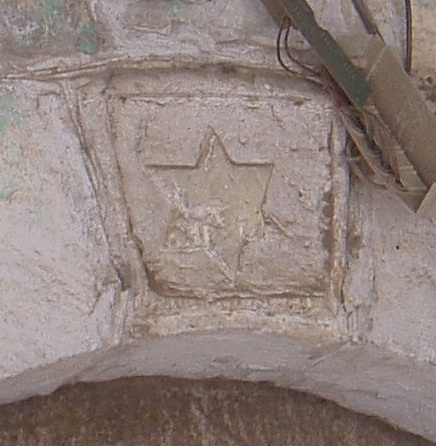
Star of David carved above entrance to a now Arab home in the Old City of Hebron

In the early 16th century, the Islamic Waqf prohibited Jews from entering the Cave of Patriarchs. Jews remained banned from the site until the 20th century. In the 16th century, Rabbi Solomon Adeni lived and worked in Hebron. Rabbi Chaim Joseph David Azulai of Hebron was sent to Europe as a Jewish emissary. In those days, most of the Jewish residents of Palestine depended on donations from overseas Jewish communities, especially the Sephardic community in the Netherlands and the Ashkenazim of Eastern Europe. In the late 18th century, Rabbi Avraham Gershon of Kitov, brother-in-law of the Baal Shem Tov, lived in Hebron.

In the early 19th century, an Ashkenazi community affiliated with Chabad Hasidism was established in Hebron. This community became the center of the Chabad dynasty in the Land of Israel. Rabbi Chaim Yeshua Bejio, then the head of the city's Sephardic and Portuguese community acquired various plots of land in Hebron. In 1807, he bought a 5-dunam plot, where the wholesale vegetable market of Hebron is located today. In May 1811, he bought 800 dunams of land from the Hebronite Tamimi family. This area included today's Tel Rumeida (Biblical Hebron) and the Tomb of Jesse. Rabbi Bejio paid for the land out of his own pocket and transferred ownership to the community.

In 1831, when Hebron came under the rule of Ibrahim Pasha, he saved the city's Jews from an attack by the local Arabs. From then on, the Jews commemorated that day, the 19th of Iyar, as the "Purim of Ibrahim." In 1834, during the Peasants’ revolt in Palestine, Arabs from Hebron carried out a pogrom in which 12 Jews were killed. At time the Jewish population numbered only 750 people.

==== Rule of Abd al-Rahman ====
In 1840, Hebron was taken over by 'Abd al-Rahman al-'Amr of Dura who ruled with a heavy hand, collecting patronage fees from the farmers and ransom from the Jews. On the 14th of Kislev, the Jewish community declared a new holiday, "Purim Takah" – "Purim of the latch" – after a bag of silver found next to a latch in the fence of the Jewish courtyard contained the exact amount that the governor was demanding.

In 1846 al-Rahman was banished from Hebron. At the beginning of 1852 he was imprisoned by the government and a Turkish ruler was appointed in his place. A few days later he fled from Jerusalem, deposed the new governor, drove out the mufti and imposed steep fines on the residents, especially the Jews.

Requests for help were sent to Jewish communities around the world, which were published in the Jewish Chronicle and other newspapers. Al-Rahman was referred to in code as "the Black Rabbi." Despite the protection money paid to him, he continued to confiscate Jewish property. In the wake of these events, some Hebronite Jews resettled in the Old City of Jerusalem and HaGai (al-Wad) Street was called "Hebron Street" by the Jews until 1948.

==== Late Ottoman period ====
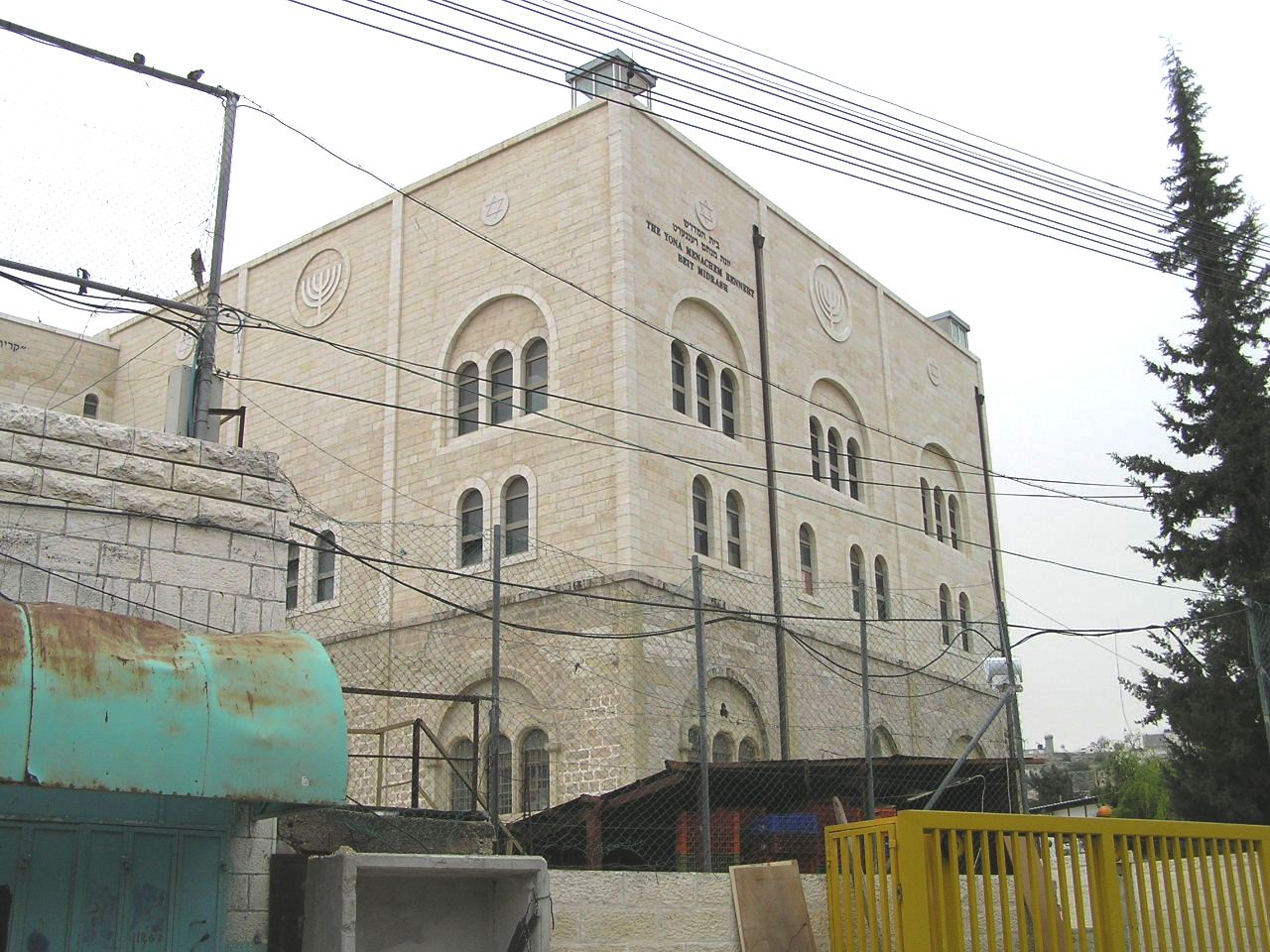
Beit Romano, built between 1875 and 1876 by Haim Yisrael Romano, a Jew from Constantinople, served as home for visiting Turkish Sephardim

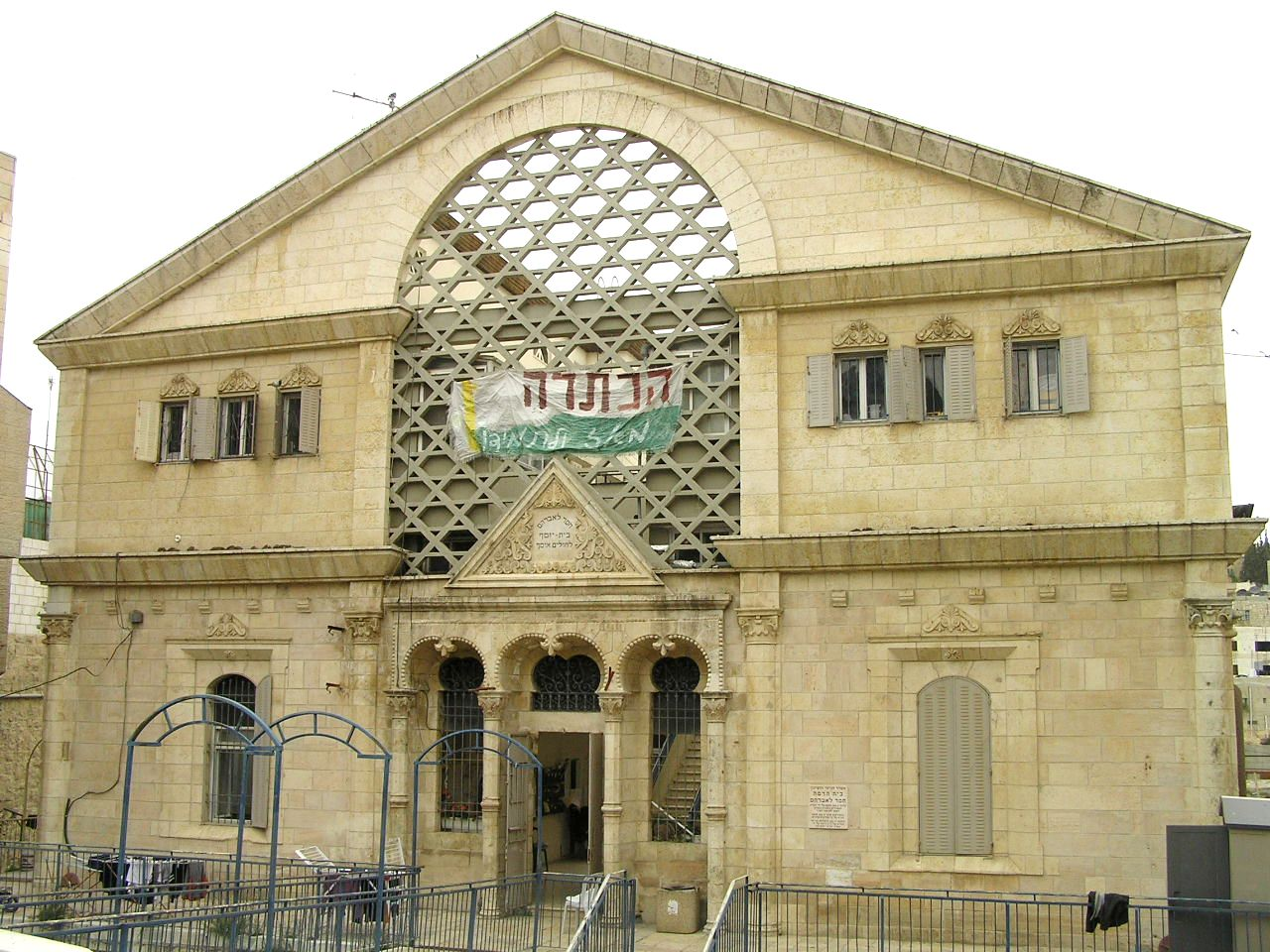
Beit Hadassah, former Jewish clinic in central Hebron. Constructed in 1893 by Haim Rahamim Yosef Franco, a Sephardi Jew from Rhodes

For seven years, Abd al-Rahman fought with his brother, Salem, over control of Hebron during which the plunder of Jewish property continued. The Jews of Hebron turned to the British Jewish community for help. In 1855, the Ottomans decided to put an end to the chaos and sent in military forces to restore order.

In 1852, Rabbi Dr. Yehuda Bibas, an early Zionist, settled in Hebron and established a study hall, donating his extensive library to the city. In 1854, Eliyahu Mani was appointed Chief Rabbi of the Hebron community. He was active in building synagogues and fundraising. By this time, the Jewish quarter was a gated community. Around 1889, a Chabad yeshiva, "Magen Avot," was established by Rabbi Shimon Menashe Chaikin and his student Rabbi Shlomo Yehuda Leib Elazarov. The institution consisted of a higher yeshiva and a Talmud Torah for children.

By 1895, the Jewish population of Hebron was 1,429 (810 Sephardim and 619 Ashkenazim), constituting approximately 10% of the city. After World War I, the number dropped to 430. In 1901, Chaim Hezekiah Medini was appointed Chief Rabbi of Hebron, a position he held until his death. Medini opened a yeshiva in Beit Romano and completed the writing of a large Talmudic encyclopedia, "Sdei Chemed".

In 1907, as the city developed economically and the Zionist Organization became active, the Eretz Israel Workers' Association (Poale Zion) established its fourth branch in Hebron. In 1911, the Chabad yeshiva "Torat Emet" was founded there. Blueprints were drawn up to build housing and a hotel, but the plan never materialized.

In July 1914, the Jewish population numbered 1,500. When World War I erupted, the Ottomans expelled many Hebron Jews with foreign citizenship and "Torat Emet" closed down. Those who remained faced conscription to the Ottoman army.

=== The British Mandate period ===
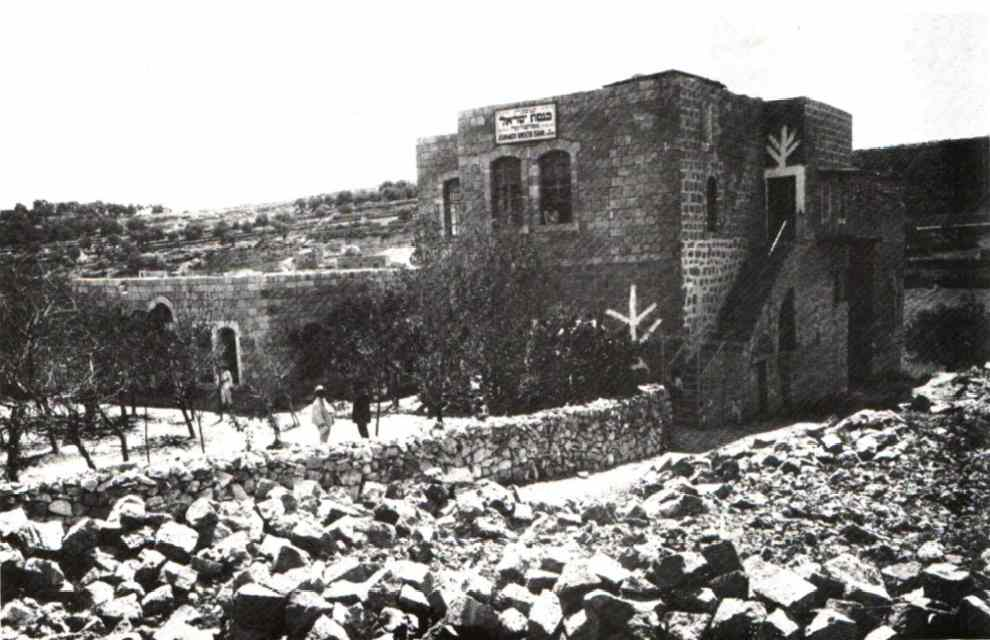
The Knesses Yisrael Yeshiva in Hebron, 1911

In December 1917, Hebron was captured by the British.

In the summer of 1924, ten students from the Slobodka yeshiva in Jerusalem established another branch of the yeshiva in Hebron headed by Rabbi Sarna. Zionist leader Menachem Ussishkin was a supporter of the yeshiva with an eye to strengthening Jewish settlement in Hebron. By the summer of 1925, enrollment was up to 120. The yeshiva attracted Jewish newcomers to the city and served as an important source of income for the local Arabs, from whom the students rented apartments and purchased goods. Friendly relations developed between the Jews and Arabs, who invited each other to family celebrations.

In 1927, the Ashkenazi and Sephardic communities formed the General Committee for the United Hebrew Community in Hebron. Rabbi Meir Shmuel Kashmir and Rabbi Yaakov Yosef Slonim served as chairmen.

In 1927, Ben-Zvi documented an entire street in Hebron inhabited by Muslims who were thought to be of Jewish ancestry. Forced to convert to Islam against their will several generations earlier, possibly around 150 years prior, they were known as the al-muḥtasibīn (المحتسبين), meaning "those who give their law to heaven". They continued to use this name in their signatures. The same family was also mentioned by Eliyahu Yehoshua Levanon, who wrote in 1937 that the muḥtasibīn came from Istanbul and converted to Islam 150 years earlier. He estimated their number to be around 300 people. In another book, Levanon recounts an Arab driver from the same family, al-muḥtasib bi-llāh. He adds that despite being considered one of the anusim, he is one of the last Arabs educated among Jews, allowing him to recite the Shema prayer and Ma Nishtana from memory, as well as sing Hatikvah.

=== 1929 Hebron massacre and its aftermath ===
On August 24, 1929, Arabs from Hebron attacked and murdered 59 of their Jewish neighbors, with eight more dying later of their injuries. 44 were seriously injured and 21 others survived with light injuries. The victims were buried in four rows in Hebron's ancient Jewish cemetery. A separate grave was dug for severed limbs, soil, blood-soaked clothes, and items removed from Jewish homes. Of the 133 Jews killed across the nation during the 1929 Palestine riots, half were killed in the Hebron massacre, in a city that had been described as a model of Arab-Jewish coexistence. John Chancellor, the High Commissioner of the British Mandate of Palestine, visited the site little over a month after the massacre, describing that "The horror of it is beyond words. In one of the houses I visited not less than twenty five Jews men & women were murdered in cold blood."

After the massacre, the British authorities ordered the evacuation in armored cars of all of Hebron's surviving Jews, many of whom had been saved by their Arab neighbors; author Yardena Schwartz described how this left the city without a Jewish population for the first time in 900 years. Knesset Israel, now known as "Hebron Yeshiva," was moved to Jerusalem. Jewish properties and homes were looted by rioters. The Hadassah building became an Arab girls' school, the Abraham Avinu synagogue was destroyed and used as a goat pen, and the Jewish cemetery was vandalized and desecrated.

The Palestine Emergency Fund had raised $2.5 million (equivalent to $57.9 million in 2025) from donors worldwide in the months after the massacre to construct a separate, better-protected Jewish community near Hebron, though the plans fell through after few refugees were willing to return to a "city of horror". A year after the incident, a group of five Jews relocated to the city. At the start of the 1936-1939 Arab Revolt, almost all the Jewish families that had settled there were evacuated from Hebron by the British, save for one that stayed until 1947.

== Culture ==
In 1937, Eliyahu Yehoshua Levanon documented various customs prevalent within the ancient Jewish community of Hebron. These practices included:

- Sephardic Jews demonstrating an impressive familiarity with the Psalms, reciting them from memory with precision.
- Observations of Babylonian Jews reciting portions of Psalm 19 as they made their way to the synagogue courtyard for Kiddush levana.
- A tradition among Jews to avoid Eshel Abraham, potentially due to its pagan associations or its historical connection to the sale of Jews into slavery.
- An anecdote noting the synagogue shamash's (attendant) habit of expressing joyous laughter following the Havdalah ceremony, symbolizing wishes for a prosperous and joy-filled week ahead.

== Sources ==
- Auerbach, Jerold S. (2009). Hebron Jews: Memory and Conflict in the Land of Israel. Rowman & Littlefield Publishers. ISBN 978-0-7425-6617-0.
