= Chadwick (surname) =

Chadwick is an English surname of Anglo-Saxon origin meaning “town or village of Chad”, and the surname originates in the parish of Rochdale where the family was given land in the township by William the Conqueror where the family lived for centuries within the village of Chadwick which bears its name, a combination of the given name Ceadda, and the Old English word wic. This family had a very long and significant association with Healey Hall. They acquired the estates through marriage to the Okeden family.

Robert Chadwick rebuilt the old mansion with stone.

John Chadwick, armour-bearer and treasurer of the district, built the present Georgian property in 1774, using the cellars of the Jacobean hall as foundations.

Colonel John Chadwick was the last of his family to live at Healey Hall. Notable people with the surname include:

- Andrés Chadwick (born 1956), Chilean politician
- Alan Chadwick (1909–1980), English organic farming innovator
- Allan Chadwick, Australian Paralympic shooter
- Arnold Jacques Chadwick (1893–1917), Canadian-born naval aviator
- Arthur Chadwick (1875–1936), English footballer
- Cassie Chadwick (1857–1907), Canadian criminal
- Charles Chadwick (disambiguation), several people
- Cy Chadwick (born 1969), British actor, director and producer
- Cyril Chadwick (1879–1955), English actor
- David Chadwick (disambiguation), several people
- Drew Chadwick, American singer in American reggae pop band Emblem3
- Edgar Chadwick (1869–1942), English footballer
- Sir Edwin Chadwick (1800–1890), English social reformer
- E. Wallace Chadwick (1884–1969), American politician
- Francis Brooks Chadwick (1850–1942/43), American painter active in France
- Frank Chadwick, American game designer and author
- French Ensor Chadwick (1844–1919), United States Navy officer who contributed to naval education
- George Chadwick (bishop) (1840–1923), Irish Anglican bishop and author
- George Whitefield Chadwick (1854–1931), American Romantic composer
- George B. Chadwick (1880–1961), American football player and coach
- Goretti Chadwick, Samoan-New Zealand stage and television actress, writer, director and tutor
- Guy Chadwick (born 1956), English singer, songwriter and guitarist
- Hannah Chadwick, American para-cyclist
- Hector Munro Chadwick (1870–1947), English philologist and historian
- Helen Chadwick (1953–1996), British sculptor, photographer and installation artist
- Helene Chadwick, American actress
- Henry Chadwick (disambiguation), several people
- H. Beatty Chadwick (born 1936), American jailed 14 years for civil contempt of court
- Sir James Chadwick (1891–1974), English physicist, recipient of the 1935 Nobel Prize in physics for the discovery of the neutron
- James Read Chadwick (1844–1905), American gynecologist and medical librarian
- Jamie Chadwick (born 1998), English racing driver
- Jeff Chadwick (born 1960), American football player
- Jeffrey R. Chadwick, American archeologist
- John White Chadwick (1840–1904), American writer and Unitarian clergyman
- John Chadwick (1920–1998), English linguist and classical scholar, co-decipherer of the Linear B script
- Sir John Chadwick (diplomat) (1911–1987), British diplomat
- Sir John Chadwick (judge) (born 1941), British judge
- June Chadwick (born 1951), English actress
- Justin Chadwick (born 1968), English actor and director
- Kate Morgan Chadwick, American actress and singer
- Les Chadwick (1943–2019), English bass guitarist
- Luke Chadwick (born 1980), English footballer
- Lynn Chadwick (1914–2003), English artist and sculptor
- Margaret Lee Chadwick (1893–1984), nonfiction author, founder and headmistress of the Chadwick School
- Maureen Chadwick (born 1959), English screenwriter and dramatist
- Michael Chadwick (swimmer) (born 1995), American swimmer
- Miles Chadwick (1880–1940), English footballer
- Nick Chadwick (born 1982), English footballer and coach
- Nora K. Chadwick (1891–1972), English medievalist
- Owen Chadwick (1916–2015), British Anglican priest, academic, writer and historian of Christianity
- Peter Chadwick (cricketer) (born 1934), English cricketer
- Paul Chadwick (born 1957), American comic-book creator
- Paul Chadwick (author) (1902–1972), American pulp magazine author
- Payton Chadwick (born 1995), American heptathlete and hurdler
- Robert Chadwick (disambiguation), several people
- Roy Chadwick (1893–1947), English aircraft design engineer
- Samuel Chadwick (1860–1932), English Methodist minister
- Sarah Chadwick (born 1960), Australian actress
- Sarah Chadwick (activist) (born 2001), American activist against gun violence
- Sonia Chadwick Hawkes (born Sonia Elizabeth Chadwick) (1933–1999), British medieval archaeologist
- Stephanie Chadwick (born 1948), New Zealand politician
- Stephen F. Chadwick (1825–1895), American Democratic politician
- Stephen J. Chadwick (1863–1931), Justice of the Washington Supreme Court
- Trevor Chadwick, (1907–1979), Refugee worker in Czechoslovakia, 1939
- W. D. Chadwick (1883–1934), American football, baseball and basketball coach

== Fictional characters ==
- Chadwick, character in Jamaica Inn (1939)
- Dr. Chadwick, character and antagonist in Ben 10 (2005–2008)
- Louis Chadwick, character in The White Shadow (1924)
- Rikki Chadwick, character in H_{2}O: Just Add Water (TV series 2006–2010)
