= Harry Chadwick =

Harry Chadwick may refer to:

- Harry Chadwick (politician) (1927–2020), member of the House of Commons of Canada
- Harry Chadwick (footballer) (1919–1987), English footballer

== See also ==
- Henry Chadwick (disambiguation)
