= Philip C. Hammond =

20th century American archaeologist

Philip C. Hammond (died 2008) was an American archaeologist. He led excavations at a number of sites in the West Bank, Jordan and Egypt, notably Nag Hammadi, Tel Rumeida, and Petra.

Jeffrey R. Chadwick described Hammond as the "Lion of Petra".

== Biography ==
After serving in World War II, he received a Ph.D. in archaeology from Yale University in 1957. He taught at Lycoming College, at the Princeton Theological Seminary, and at Brandeis University. In 1969 he joined the University of Utah.
