= Killing of Sam Abu Haikal =

2026 Killing of 7 months old Palestinian in Hebron, West Bank

- Date: 5 June 2026
- Location: Tel Rumeida, Hebron, Israeli-occupied West Bank
- Type: Shooting
- Deaths: Sam Fahd Abu Haikal
- Injuries: Fahd Abu Haikal; Daniyah Abu Haikal
- Accused: Israeli soldier

On 5 June 2026, Sam Fahd Abu Haikal, a seven-month-old Palestinian infant, was shot and killed by an Israeli soldier in Tel Rumeida, Hebron, in the Israeli-occupied West Bank. His parents, Fahd Abu Haikal and Daniyah Abu Haikal, were wounded in the same shooting.

The Israel Defense Forces (IDF) said that soldiers had perceived a vehicle accelerating toward them and that one soldier fired at the vehicle. It said an initial inquiry found that those wounded were uninvolved civilians. Abu Haikals father and grandmother disputed the Israeli account, saying that the family had stopped the car before the shooting. On 7 June, the Israeli military said that its military police criminal investigation division had opened an investigation.

== Background ==
Tel Rumeida is an area of Hebron where Israeli settlers live among Palestinian residents under heavy Israeli military protection. Reuters described the area as a long-standing flashpoint for violence in the occupied West Bank. Violence in the West Bank had increased after the outbreak of the Israel-Hamas war in October 2023. According to the United Nations, more than a 1000 Palestinians, including at least 240 children, had been killed in the West Bank and East Jerusalem since the beginning of the war.

== Shooting ==
According to the Palestinian Health Ministry, Sam Fahd Abu Haikal was killed on 5 June 2026 while travelling with his parents in the Tel Rumeida area south of Hebron. The car was driven by Sam's father, Fahd, while the infant and his mother sat in the backseat with Sam's older brother Kinan. The infant's grandmother, Feryal Abu Heikal, who was also with them in the car, said that the family was driving near a checkpoint when they saw Israeli military vehicles and soldiers, stopped the car, and then came under fire.

Fahd Abu Haikal, a Bethlehem University lecturer and Sam's father, told the Associated Press that a bullet passed through the windshield, pierced his right hand, and struck his son and wife in the back seat. Associated Press journalists who viewed the car reported that another bullet had struck the hood. Fahad Abu Haikal later told reporters that the soldier was standing about ten meters in front of the car and fired through the windshield after the car had already stopped.

Sam was taken to the hospital by his father and pronounced dead three hours later. The same bullet that killed the infant went through his mother's jaw, leaving shrapnel fragment near her heart which was not removed by the doctors for fear of complications of such an operation near the artery. In a later interview with Daniyah at her home in Bethlehem, reporters noted a large scar on her face.

The Israeli military said that soldiers had perceived the vehicle as accelerating toward them. It said that one soldier fired single shots at the vehicle, and that an initial inquiry found that the three wounded Palestinians were uninvolved civilians. The IDF later said that it expressed "deep sorrow for any harm caused to uninvolved individuals".

== Video Evidence ==
On 10 June 2026, footage of the incident obtained by the Israeli Information Center for Human Rights, B'Tselem, was released. According to The Guardian, the footage appeared to contradict the Israeli military's account by showing the family's car slowing near a military post before soldiers opened fire. B'Tselem said that the footage showed the car was slowing to a stop and "posed no danger" to the soldiers.

A second video obtained by B'Tselem showed Fahd Abu Haikal holding the infant after the shooting, while Daniyah Abu Haikal sat on the ground near the car after being wounded. B'Tselem also said the footage shows that the soldier who opened fire left the scene with another soldier without either of them offering aid to the infant or his injured mother. Eyewitnesses also testified that no medical attention was provided by any of the soldiers present.

== Aftermath and investigation ==
Sam Abu Haikal was buried in Hebron on 6 June 2026. The Associated Press reported that his body was wrapped in a Palestinian flag during the funeral, and that his father demanded justice.

On 7 June the Israeli military said that the Military Police Criminal Investigation Division had opened an investigation into the killing. The IDF said that the findings would be transferred to the Military Advocate General's Office. The military had not identified the soldier or said whether the soldiers involved are still on duty. Sam's father told the Telegraph he "has little hope" of the killer being punished. According to Israeli rights group Yesh Din, between 2016 and 2024 there were over 2,400 complaints against the IDF by Palestinians, of which less than 1% resulted in charges being brought.

A CNN team canvassed the location of the shooting and was able to locate several CCTV cameras but according to local residents and business owners, the IDF had returned to the area and confiscated all CCTV recordings, CNN was unable to obtain any additional footage of the incident and the IDF declined to comment on the matter.

An Al-araby TV crew further investigated the incident, consulting Google earth maps, they found no evidence of a permanent checkpoint in the area, which supports the family's testimony of not expecting the presence of the IDF. Furthermore, the investigation attempted to identify the unit that was on duty during the shooting through witness testimonies and open sources. According to their report, the "Yahuda" Brigade which is in charge of IDF operations in Hebron was managing that checkpoint on that day, and that the brigade was led by Colonel Shahar Barkai, who was relieved of duty and transferred to South Korea to serve as military attaché only two days after the shooting, though it is not clear if there is any connection between the shooting and his transfer.

== See also ==
- Tel Rumeida
- Israeli-occupied West Bank
- Israeli–Palestinian conflict
