= Philip Hammond (disambiguation) =

Philip Hammond, Baron Hammond of Runnymede (born 1955) is a British politician.

Philip Hammond may also refer to:

- Philip Hammond (composer) (born 1951), Irish composer
- Phil Hammond (born 1962), British doctor and comedian
- Philip C. Hammond, archaeologist

== See also ==
- Philip Hamond (1883–1953), British Army officer
