= Deir Al Arba'een =

Building in State of Palestine

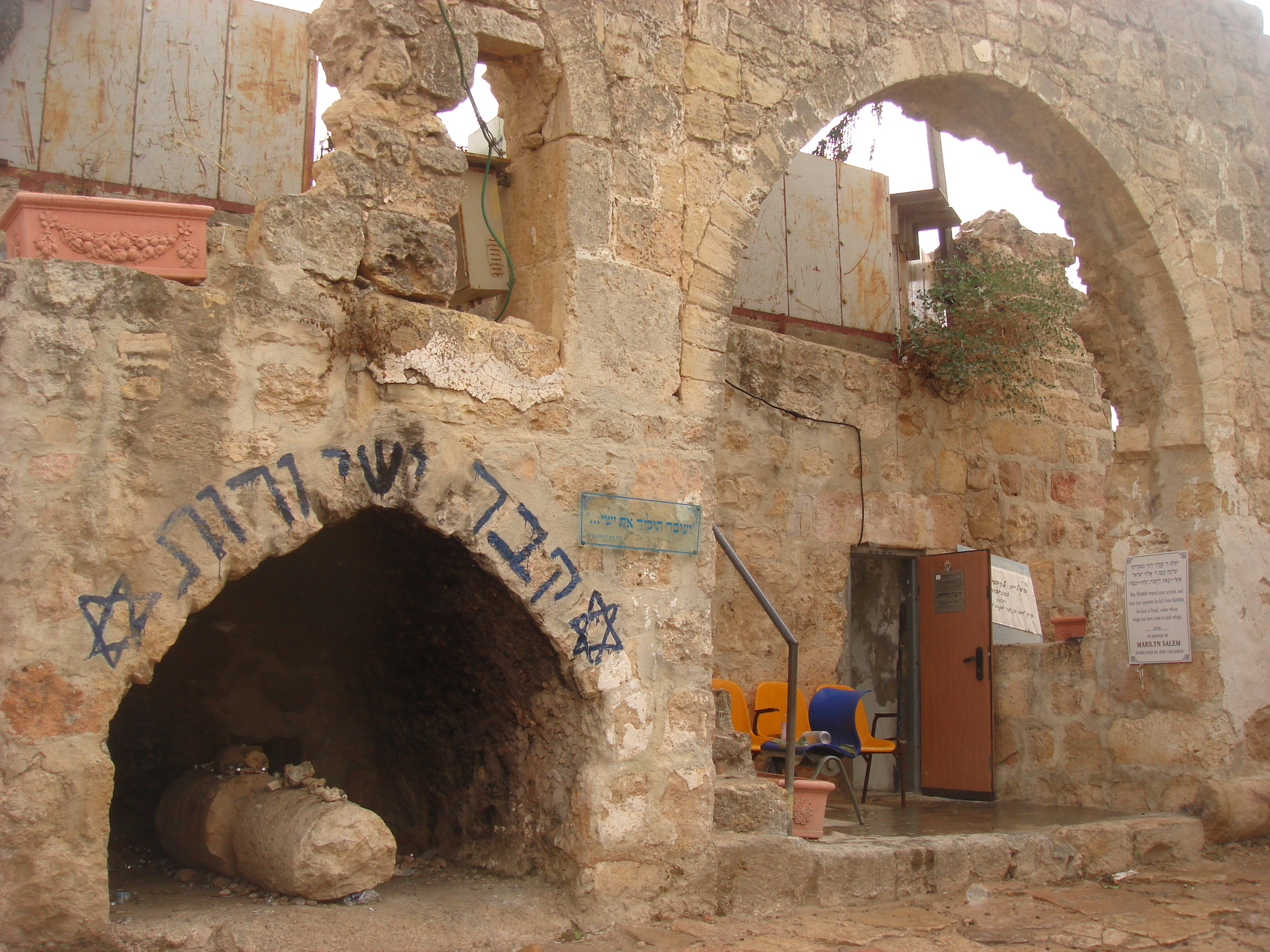
Deir Al-Arba'een, showing the entrance to the tombs on the bottom left.

Deir Al Arba'een (Arabic: دير الأربعين, lit. 'Sanctuary of the Forty'), also Masha'ad Al Arba'een, is a ruined building approximately 300 meters to the West of the Old City of Hebron. It is considered the most notable ancient structure on Tel Rumeida.

It was described by the 1874 PEF Survey of Palestine and in 1911–14 by Andreas Evaristus Mader.

A corner of the building contains what is thought to be the Tomb of Jesse and Ruth.

== Description ==
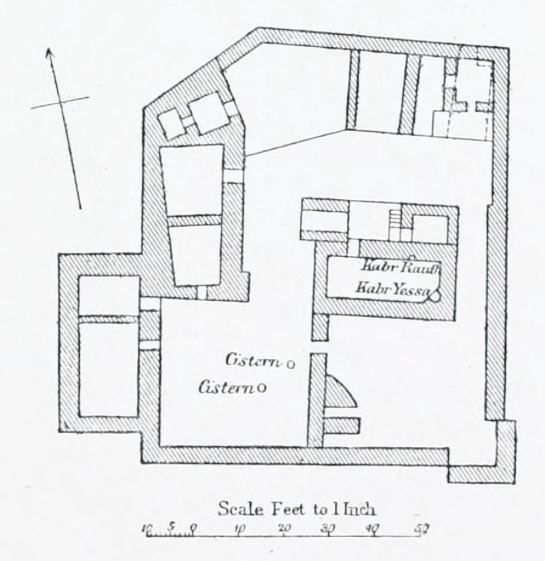
Diagram of Deir Al-Arba'in published by the PEF Survey of Palestine.

The ruin, surrounded by a quadrangular wall structure and vaulted rooms, consisted of a single cell chapel and semi-circular apse.

The central structure measures 5.5 by 10 metres, surrounded by a quadrangular wall measuring 25 by 30 metres that enclosed vaulted rooms.

It is sited above what was formerly known as the 'Ain Khibra, renamed the 'Ain Judaida.

The PEF Survey of Palestine described the ruins as follows: "The building seems to be a modern Arabic work on older foundations... Several pillar shafts lie in the ruins. The vaults which remain have both groined and tunnel roofs, with pointed arches. Lower down the hill, on the north-east, are three parallel vaults, bearing 109° along this length, ruined on the east ends. They have a sloping outer scarp, and the building measures about 60 feet square outside. The walls are 9 feet thick; the vaults have tunnel roofs. The masonry resembles that of the Deir — stones rudely squared, 2 1/2 feet by 1 3/4 feet by 1 1/2 feet high, or 10 inches by 13 inches high. Some stones lie near having rude drafts."

The Sakawati vaults are 8 feet by 4 feet, and 32 feet high.

== History ==
It was described by Mujir al-Din, in his History of Jerusalem and Hebron (c.1495) as a pilgrimage site visited by Muslim pilgrims (ziyārah).

This site began to be called Deir al-Arba'een (Mosque of the Forty [Witnesses]) by the 19th century. According to Moshe Sharon, both names, Mashhad al-Arba’in and Dayr al-Arba’in, appear to reflect the ancient name for Hebron, Qiryat Arba’, and thus would not refer to forty martyrs.

Juan Perera, a Franciscan writing c.1553, described what was known in the Christian tradition as the Church of the Forty Martyrs, (Ecclesia quadraginta martyrum), which had been transformed into a mosque, and was apparently associated with Cain's murder of Abel.

There is no evidence of its use by Christians in the medieval period.

Francesco Quaresmi in the early 17th century, described its remains as the chancel of the earlier church, and observed that Turks and Orientals generally held this structure to be the tomb of Jesse.

Gotthilf Heinrich von Schubert described the buildings in 1837.

Georg Rosen and Arthur Penrhyn Stanley visited the site on their journey to Palestine with the Prince of Wales in the mid-nineteenth century. Rosen wrote that the tradition that a tomb in the building is that of Jesse is "very young", noting that 17th-century traveller Laurent d'Arvieux described it as the tomb of Caleb. Rosen also stated that the tomb does not "seem to be particularly revered by the Jews of Hebron".

== Tomb of Jesse and Ruth ==
These identifications are, according to Moshe Sharon, rather late since they are not mentioned by the Arab medieval writer Mujir al-Din. Rabbi Jacob, the Messenger of Yechiel of Paris, around 1238–1244, stated that either Jesse or Joab was buried in a cave on this Hebron hillsite. The Italian Jewish traveler, Rabbi Meshulam of Volterra, stated that the tomb of Jesse he visited in 1481 was located 10 miles from Hebron. In 1522-3 Rabbi Moses ben Mordecai Bassola visited the site, mentioning only Jesse's tomb in a burial cave, putatively, in local folklore, connected by tunnel to the Cave of the Patriarchs.

Ruth's tomb only began to be pointed out at the outset of the 19th century.

== Sakawati vaults ==
The Sakawati vaults contain another tomb bearing the inscription of Seiyid el 'Alam el 'Araf el Mehakkik Muhammed Ibn 'Abdallah el Hasany, with a date, 27 Rejeb, 652 AH (1254 C.E.) The PEF Survey of Palestine in 1874 noted that a pottery lamp burnt over the tomb, and it was known to the locals as the tomb of Sheikh el Mujahed or Abu es Sakawati.
