= Leslie Chadwick =

New Zealand cricketer (1889–1970)

Personal information
- Full name: Leslie Norman Chadwick
- Born: 16 March 1889; Dunedin, Otago, New Zealand
- Died: 10 October 1970 (aged 81); Dunedin, Otago, New Zealand
- Batting: Right-handed
- Bowling: Batsman
- Relatives: Charles Chadwick

Domestic team information
- Years: Team
- 1919/20: Otago
- Source: ESPNcricinfo, 6 May 2016

Leslie Norman Chadwick (16 March 1889 – 10 October 1970) was a New Zealand cricketer. He played two first-class matches for Otago during the 1919–20 season.

Chadwick was born at Dunedin in 1889. He worked as an accountant. His brother Charles Chadwick also played first-class matches for Otago. Chadwick enlisted in the Otago Infantry Regiment in 1916, during World War I. He fought on the Western Front, arriving in France in 1916, and was wounded multiple times during the war.

Having previously played for the Otago team in the annual match against Southland in 1912–13, Chadwick made his first-class debut for the side against the same team in December 1919, playing alongside his brother. He scored 28 runs as Otago won by an innings in a low-scoring contest. At the beginning of January he scored eight and six against Wellington in his only other first-class match. He was a member of Grange Cricket Club and Dunedin Cricket Club.

Chadwick died at Dunedin in 1970. He was aged 81.
