= Charles Chadwick =

Charles Chadwick may refer to:

- Charles Chadwick (athlete) (1874–1953), American track and field athlete who competed in the 1904 Summer Olympics
- Charles Chadwick (cricketer) (1880–1942), New Zealand cricketer
- Charles Chadwick (novelist) (1932–2025), English novelist
