= Tomb of Jesse and Ruth =

Ancient tomb, synagogue and archaeological site in Hebron.

- קבר ישי ורות (Hebrew)
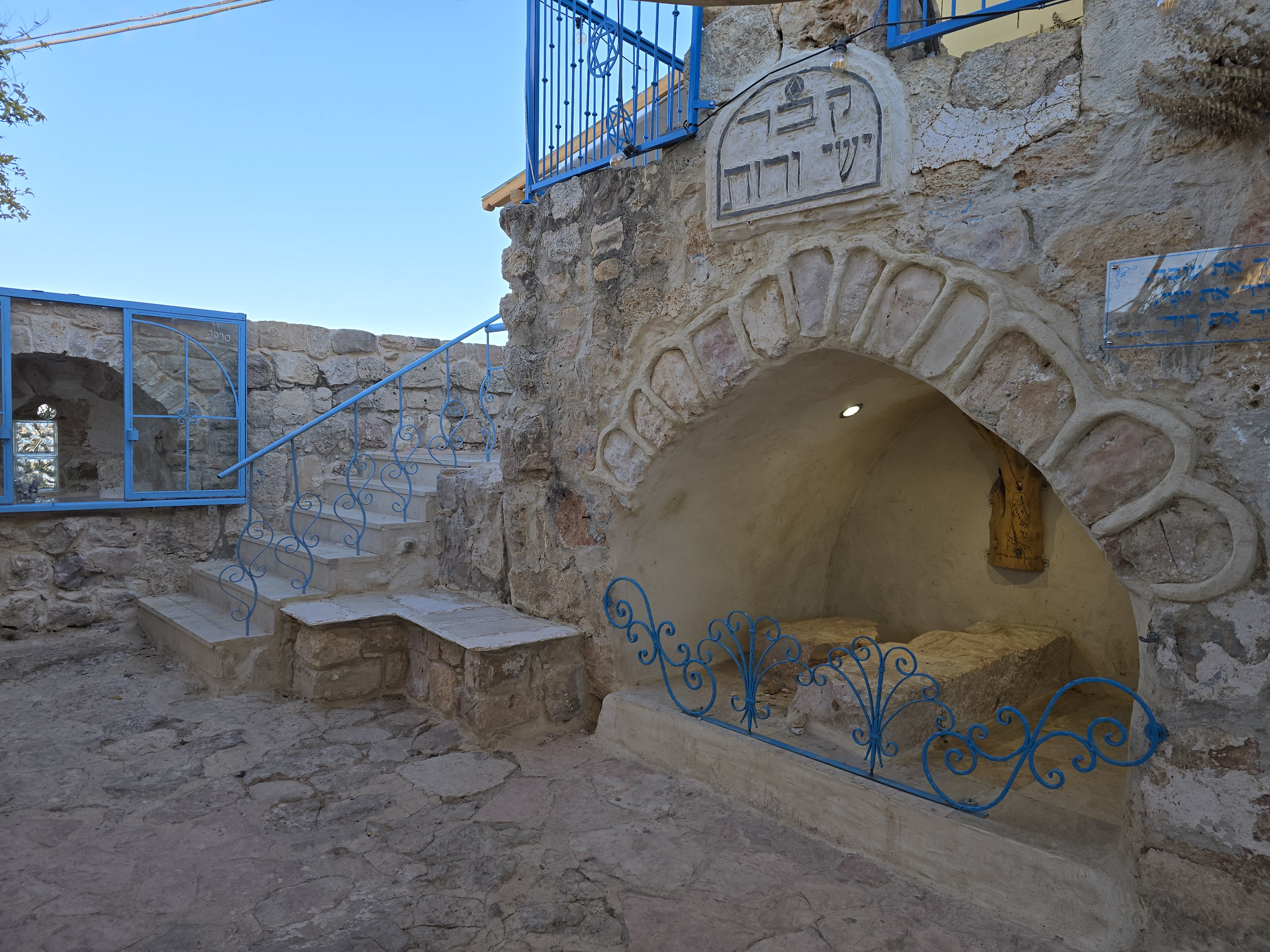
- The Tomb of Jesse and Ruth in Hebron

Religion
- Affiliation: Judaism
- Ecclesiastical or organisational status: Tomb and sacred site; Synagogue
- Status: Active

Location
- Location: Deir Al Arba'een, Hebron, West Bank
- Interactive map of Tomb of Jesse and Ruth
- Coordinates: 31°31′24″N 35°06′13″E
- Mashhad al-Arba’in (Sanctuary of the Forty); D(a)ir al-Arba'in (Mosque of the Forty [Witnesses])
- Type: Tomb

The tomb of Jesse and Ruth (Hebrew: קבר ישי ורות, romanized: Kever Yishai v'Rut) is an ancient tomb with a small Jewish synagogue, located within the ruin of Deir Al Arba'een in the Tel Rumeida section of Hebron. Francesco Quaresmi in the early 17th century reported that Turks and Orientals generally believed the structure contained the tombs of Jesse and Ruth. According to Moshe Sharon, According to Jewish tradition, the tomb of Jesse and Ruth is a sacred site. The place is in area H2 of Hebron, under Israeli control.

The small synagogue is located in the room adjacent to the tomb and it receives visitors throughout the year, especially on the Jewish holiday of Shavuot, in which the Book of Ruth is read.

== History ==
=== Mamluk period ===
One of the earliest known references to the tomb comes from an unnamed student of the Ramban who visited the site between 1289 and 1290. He wrote of visiting the "cave of Jesse's grave" on a hilltop near the Cave of the Patriarchs and the ancient Jewish Cemetery of Hebron. Yaakov HaShaliach, a Jewish traveller, mentions visiting the grave of Jesse, father of David in Hebron in the year 1235, but he does not specify the burial place. Rabbi Ovadia of Bertinoro (1445-1515) mentions praying there in his travel writings.

=== Ottoman era ===
In 1522, Rabbi Moses ben Mordecai Bassola wrote,

"… at the summit of the mountain opposite Hebron is the burial place of Jesse, David's father. It has a handsome building with a small window that looks down on the burial cave. They say that once they threw a cat through the window and it emerged from the hole in the Cave of the Patriarchs. The distance between them is half a mile."

Yihus HaAvos V'Neviim (Lineage of the Patriarch and the Prophets) a book from 1537 refers to the site as "a handsome building up on the mount, where Jesse, the King David's father is buried." It includes a drawing of the site, and notes an "ancient Israelite burial ground" nearby and Crusader courtyard.

Karaite travellers wrote of the site, Samuel ben David of Crimea in 1642, and Benjamin Ben-Eliyahu in 1785.,

The first known written reference to the site housing the tomb of both Jesse and Ruth comes from the 1835 book Love of Jerusalem by Haim Horwitz, referencing local oral traditions.

Menachem Mendel of Kamenitz wrote in 1839,

"Here I write of the graves of the righteous to which I paid my respects. Hebron – Described above is the character and order of behavior of those coming to pray at the Cave of ha-Machpelah. I went there, between the stores, over the grave of Abner ben Ner and was required to pay a Yishmaeli – the grave was in his courtyard – to allow me to enter. Outside of the city I went to the grave of Othniel ben Kenaz and, next to him, are laid to rest 9 students in niches in the wall of a shelter standing in a vineyard. I gave 20 pa’res to the owner of the vineyard. Also in the vineyard was a shelter with 2 graves: one of Jesse, father of David, and one of Ruth, the Moabite. I gave the vineyard owner 20 pa’res. I also went to a grave said to be that of the Righteous Rav, author of Reshit Hokhma."

=== British Mandate ===
During the British Mandate era (1917-1948), the Tomb of Jesse and Ruth was recognized as one of the many historic sites associated with Jewish tradition in the Land of Israel. The site was visited and described by several scholars, geographers, and archaeologists who documented its condition and folklore at the time. The French Dominican archaeologist and scholar Louis-Hugues Vincent (1872–1960), who lived and worked in Jerusalem, made extensive studies of ancient sites in the region during the early 20th century. In his seminal two volume work on Hebron, published in 1923, Vincent discussed the ruins of Deir al-Arbaʿeen: the complex within which the tomb traditionally ascribed to Jesse and Ruth is located. His work provided one of the earliest modern archaeological descriptions of the structure and its local traditions, situating it within the broader historical landscape of Hebron.

In 1935, the noted Israeli geographer and travel writer Zev Vilnay visited the tomb as part of his survey of holy places in the Land of Israel. Vilnay recorded that local custodians at the site claimed the tomb once connected by a subterranean passage to the nearby the Cave of the Patriarchs. According to his account, this supposed passageway was filled in during the First World War, and the entrance was no longer known by the time he visited.

Archaeologist Jacob Pinkerfield (1897–1956) also examined the site during the Mandate period. Pinkerfield included discussions of the tomb and its synagogue in his 1945/46 book The Synagogues in Eretz Yisra’el, in which he surveyed ancient synagogue sites and Jewish sacred places throughout the country. His observations contributed to recognizing the site’s dual character as both a burial tradition and a place of historical Jewish worship.

=== Jordanian period (1948–1967) ===
Following the 1948 Arab-Israeli War, Hebron came under Jordanian rule, and Jewish access to sites in the city was effectively barred. Jewish communities were expelled from the area, and many historic Jewish sites, including components of the ancient cemetery adjacent to Tel Rumeida, were neglected or desecrated during this period. Around 4,000 tombstones were removed from the old Jewish cemetery and repurposed for construction. Although specific documentation of the Tomb of Jesse and Ruth’s condition during this time is limited, the site remained inaccessible and fell into disrepair along with other Jewish heritage sites in Hebron.

=== Post-1967 ===
Following the 1967 Six Day War and the transfer of control of Hebron to Israel, Jewish access to sites on Tel Rumeida, including the Tomb of Jesse and Ruth, gradually resumed. In the 1970s, the site was examined and partially excavated by Professor Ben Zion Tavger, who documented architectural remains and worked to clear debris that had accumulated over previous decades. As a result of this work, the site was reopened to visitors, marking its first regular public access since 1948. In the decades that followed, the tomb functioned primarily as a modest prayer site, receiving periodic maintenance but no large scale development. Access remained limited, and the structure retained a largely unmodernized character. During this period, the site was occasionally referenced in archaeological and heritage discussions relating to Tel Rumeida, though it remained secondary to larger excavation areas in the vicinity.

== Modern structural improvements ==
In the late 20th and early 21st centuries, the Tomb of Jesse and Ruth underwent a series of gradual improvements following decades of neglect. The site was first reopened in the mid 1970s through the efforts of Professor Ben Zion Tavger, who worked to restore access and basic usability. Additional maintenance and minor repairs were carried out intermittently in subsequent years. More substantial infrastructure upgrades began to take place in the mid 2010s, including the introduction of electricity and furnishings in the synagogue area around 2016. The most significant structural restorations that took place involved the reinforcement of stone walls and ceilings to prevent collapse, the laying of tile flooring, and the addition of modern amenities such as air conditioning and running water. This period of development also included the creation of landscaped gardens, benches, and movie screens to accommodate the thousands of pilgrims who visit annually. In May 2025, the site’s religious infrastructure the site's first purpose-written Torah scroll was dedicated and a large ceremonial mezuzah was installed at the entrance gate. In September 2026, a $1 million project was completed that included a new synagogue and the refinishing of the tombs with stone from the Hebron area that was decorated with a theme of wheat to represent the role of the wheat harvest in the narrative of the Book of Ruth in the Hebrew Bible.

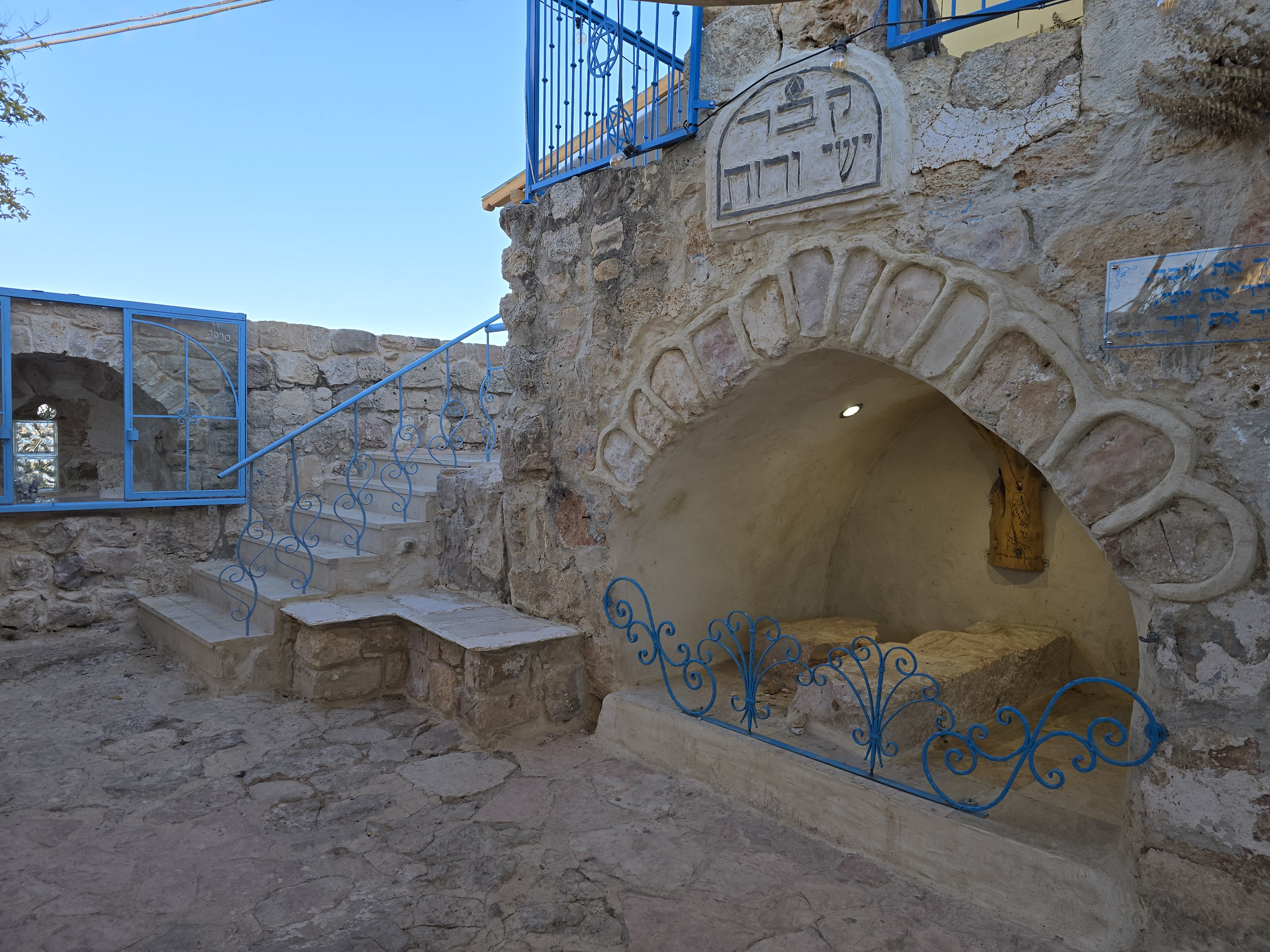
Tomb of Jesse and Ruth in Hebron

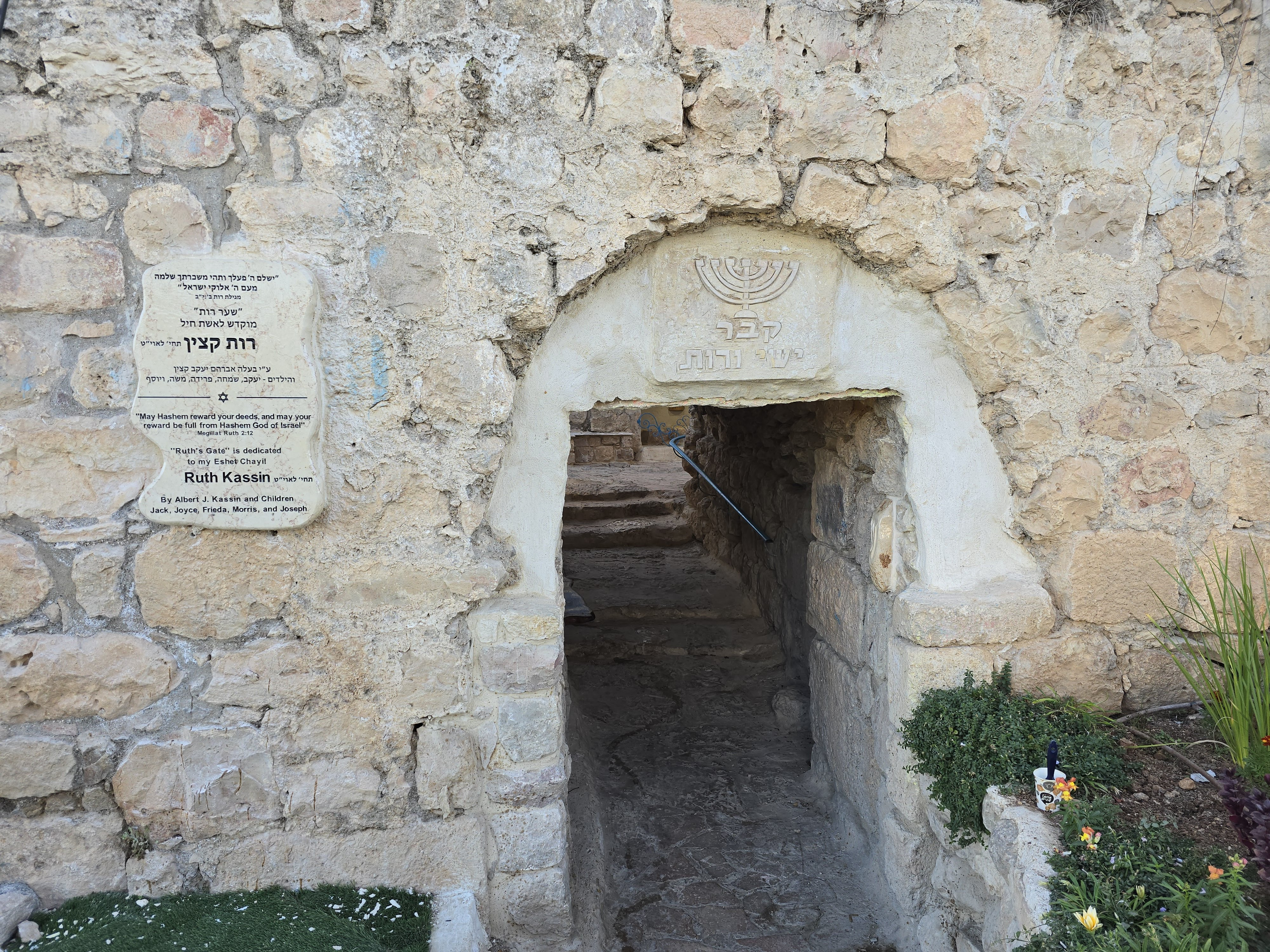
Entrence to Tomb of Jesse and Ruth in Hebron

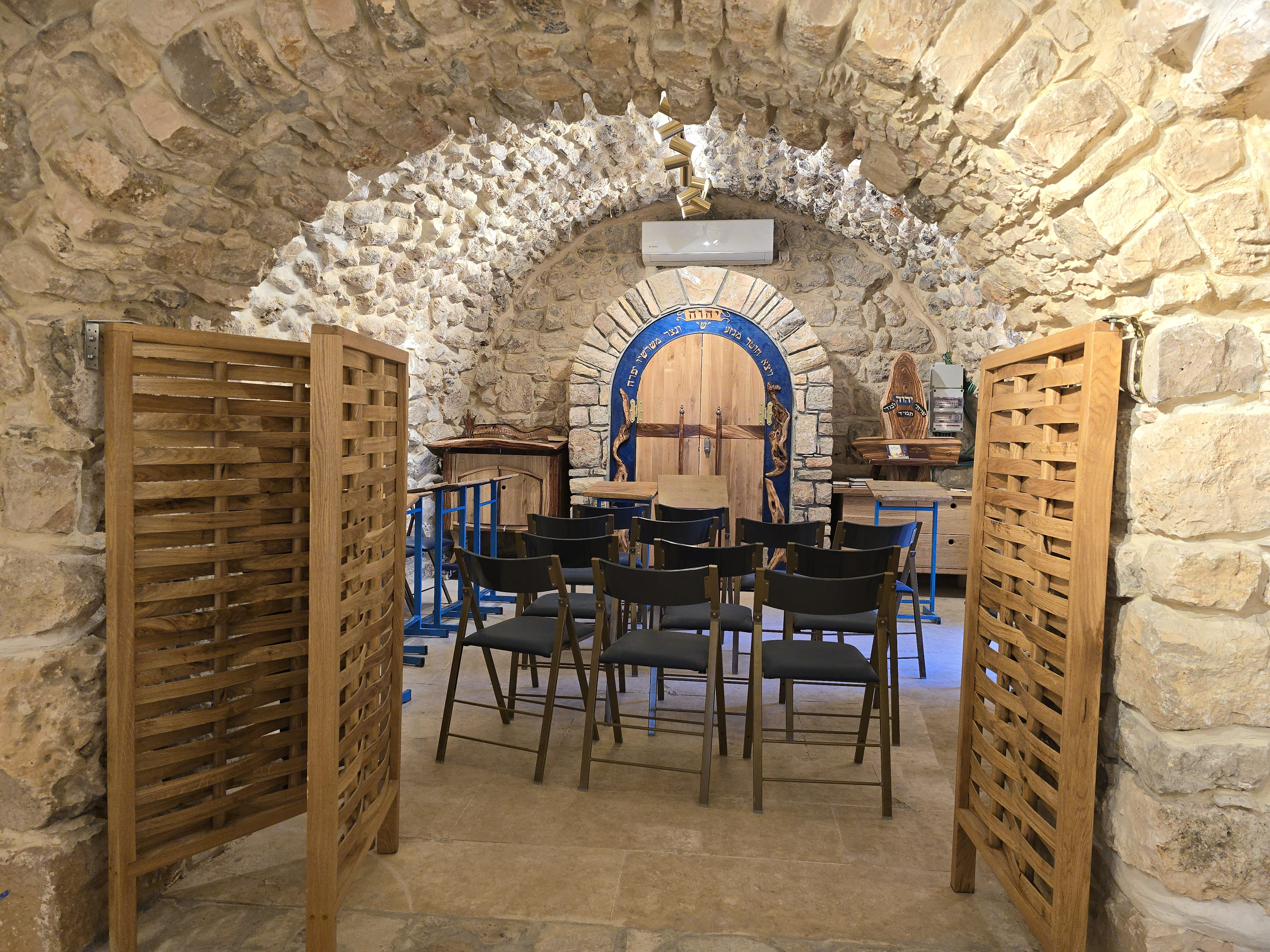
Tomb of Jesse and Ruth synagogue

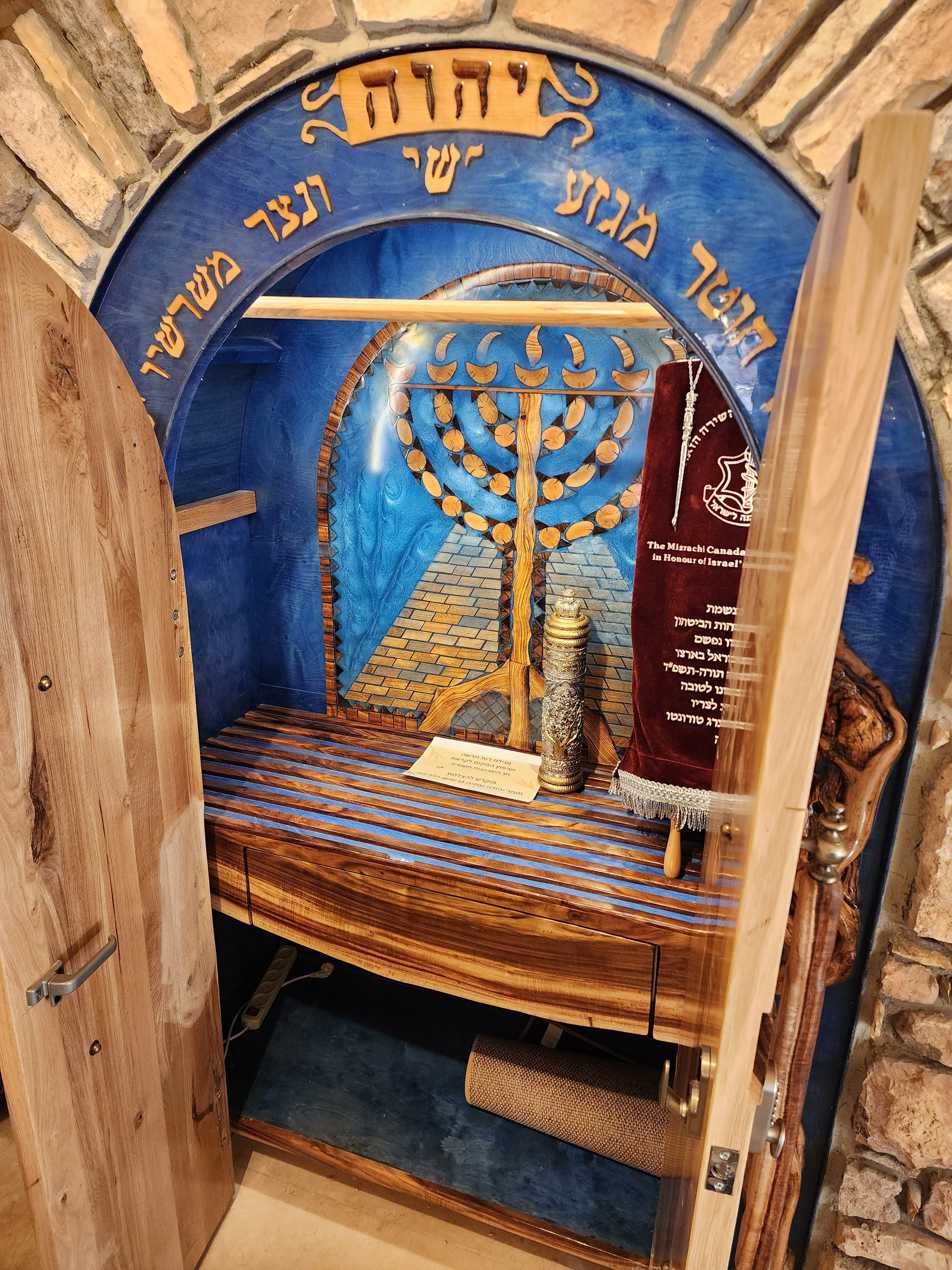
Aron Kodesh at the Tomb of Jesse and Ruth

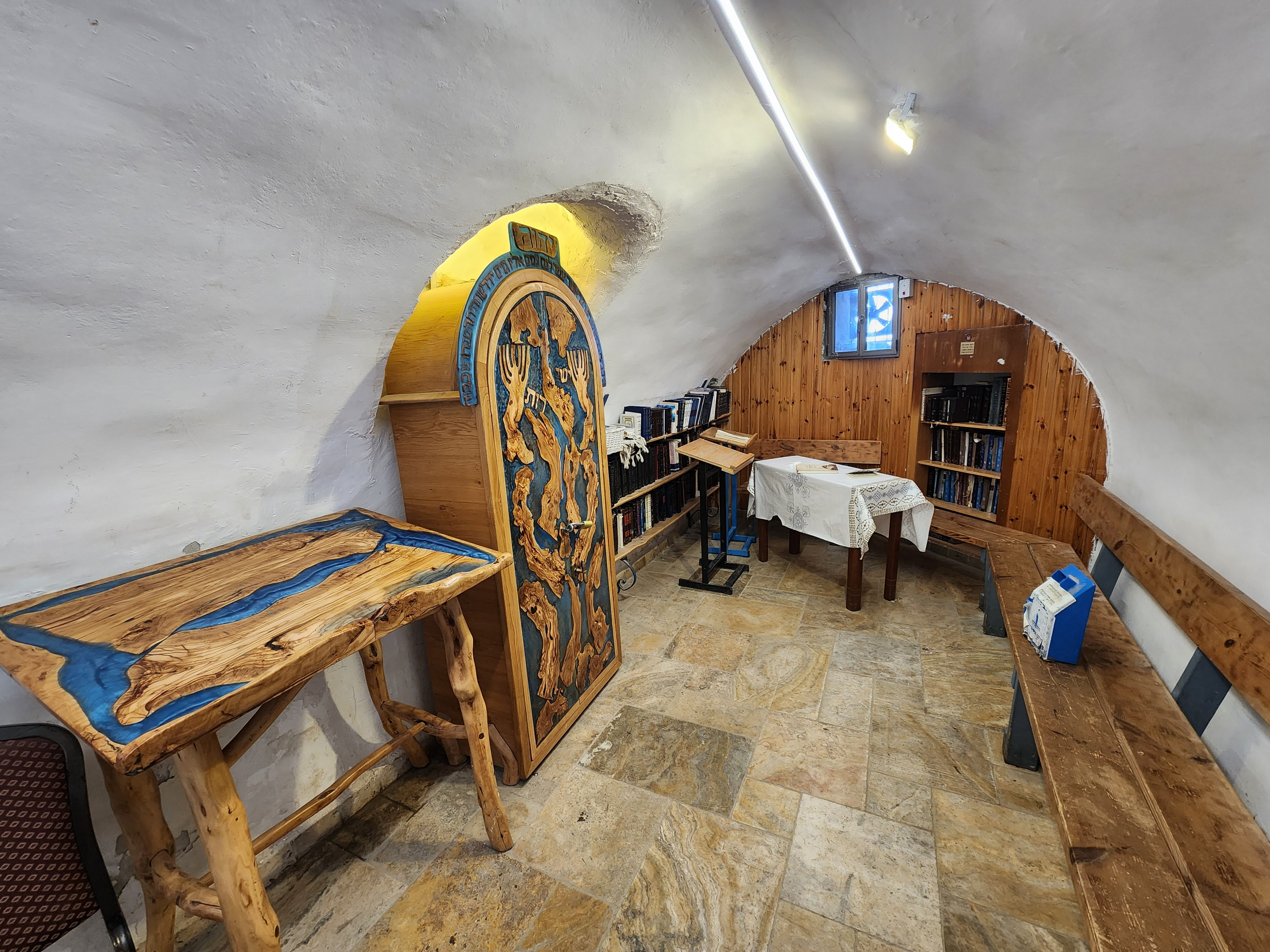
Synagogue in the Tomb of Jesse and Ruth, Hebron

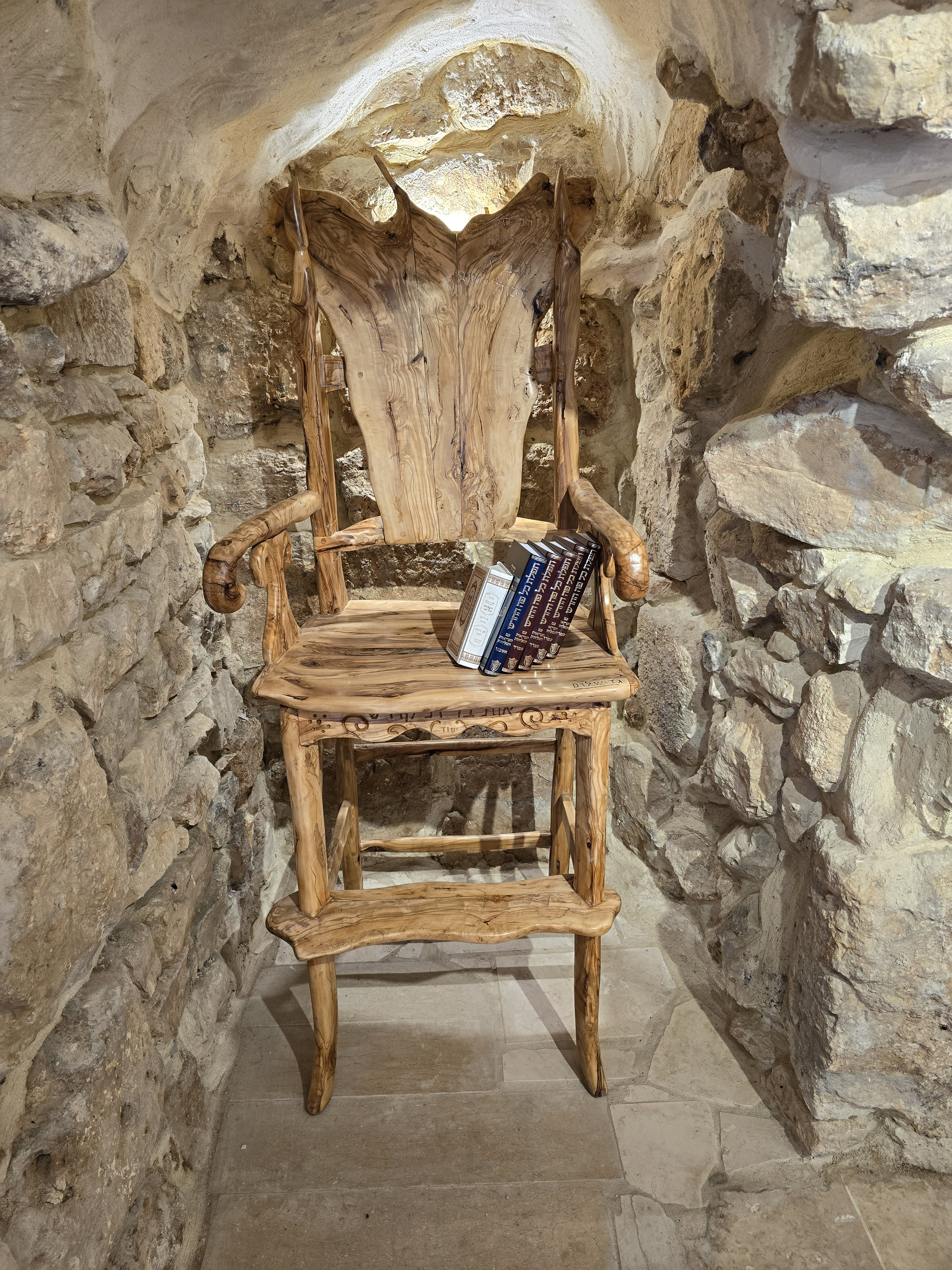
Elijah chair in Tomb of Jesse and Ruth

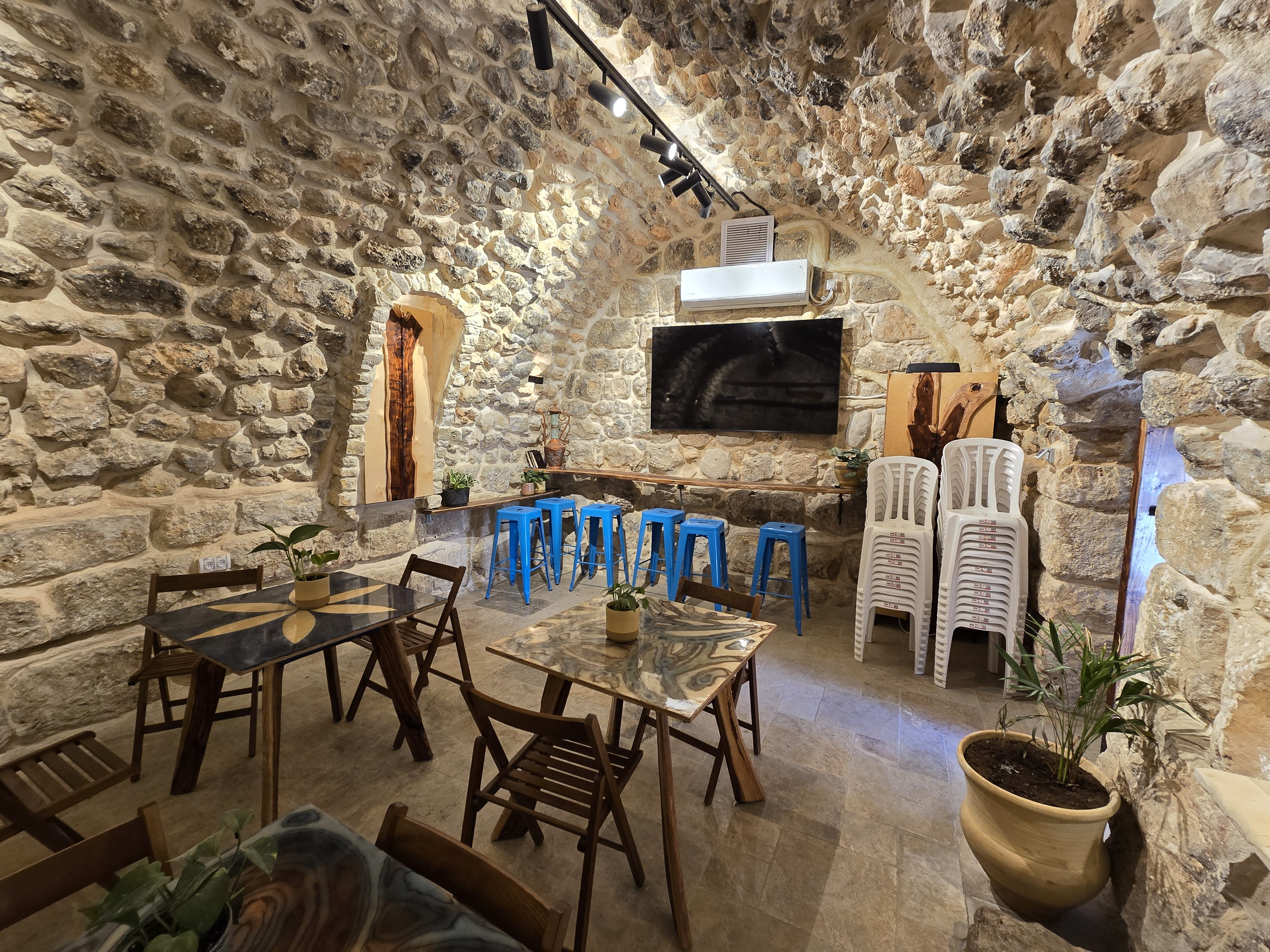
Tomb of Jesse and Ruth, Hebron

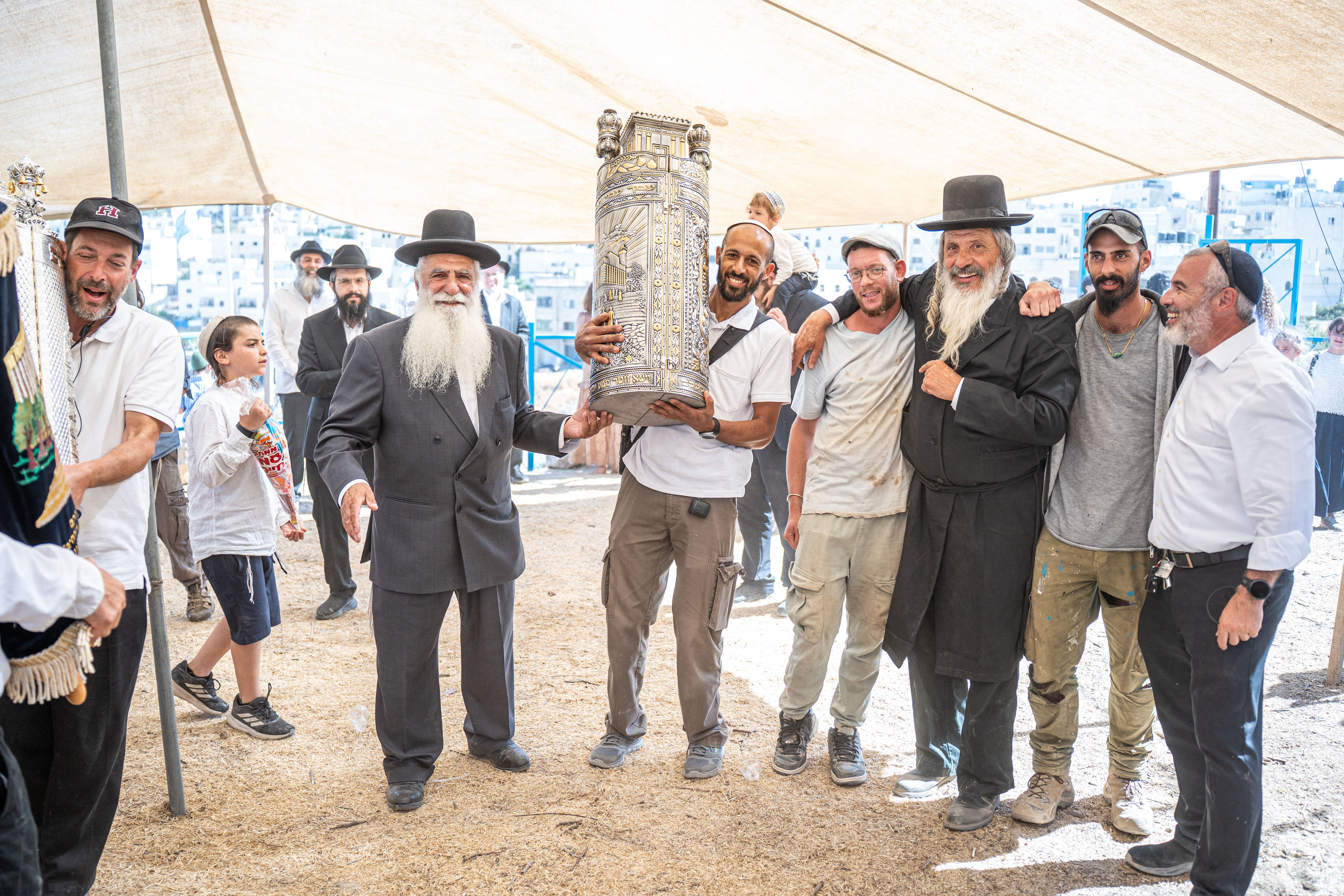
Dedication of a new Torah Scroll, Tomb of Jesse and Ruth, Hebron.

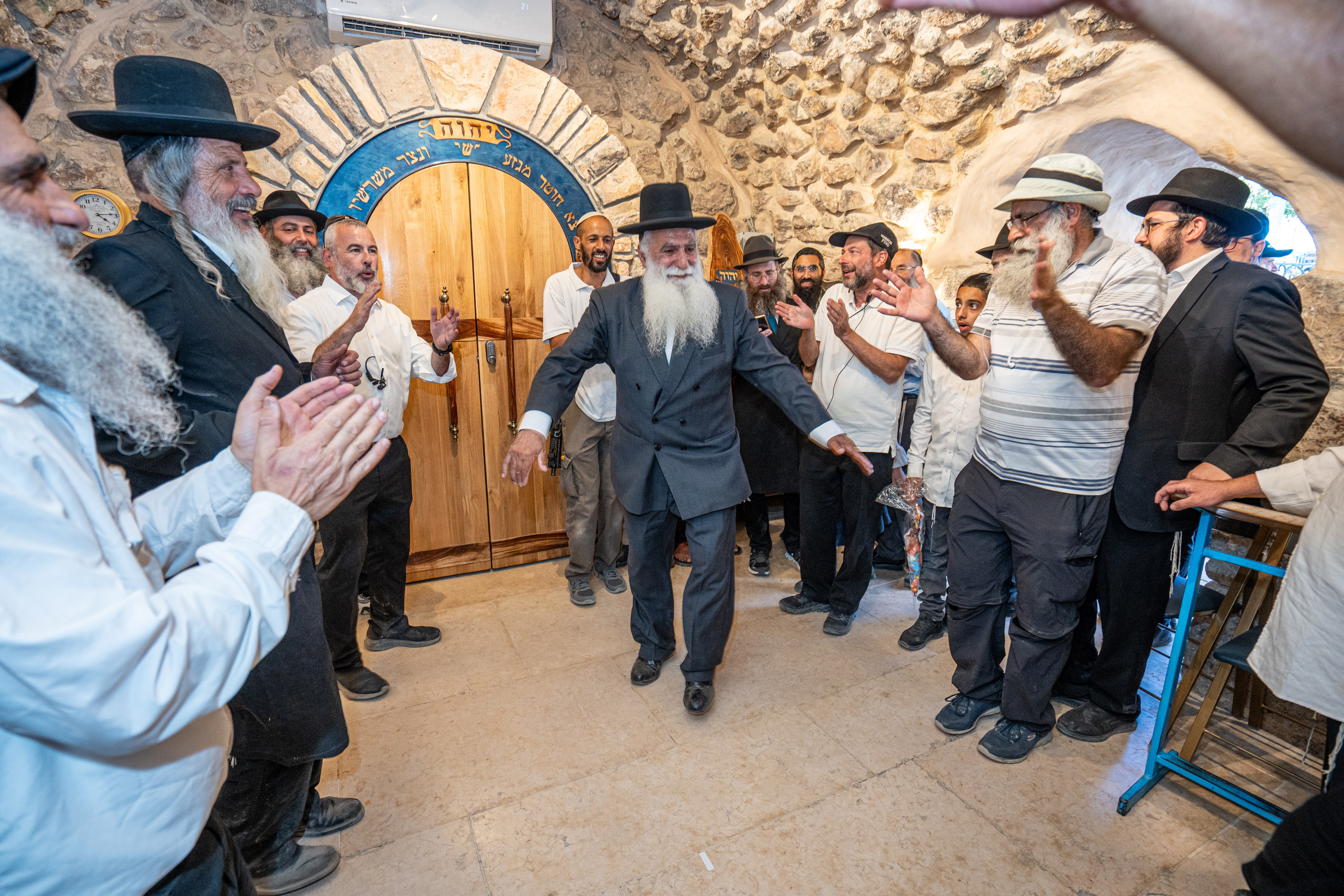
Celebration for a new Torah scroll, Tomb of Jesse and Ruth, Hebron

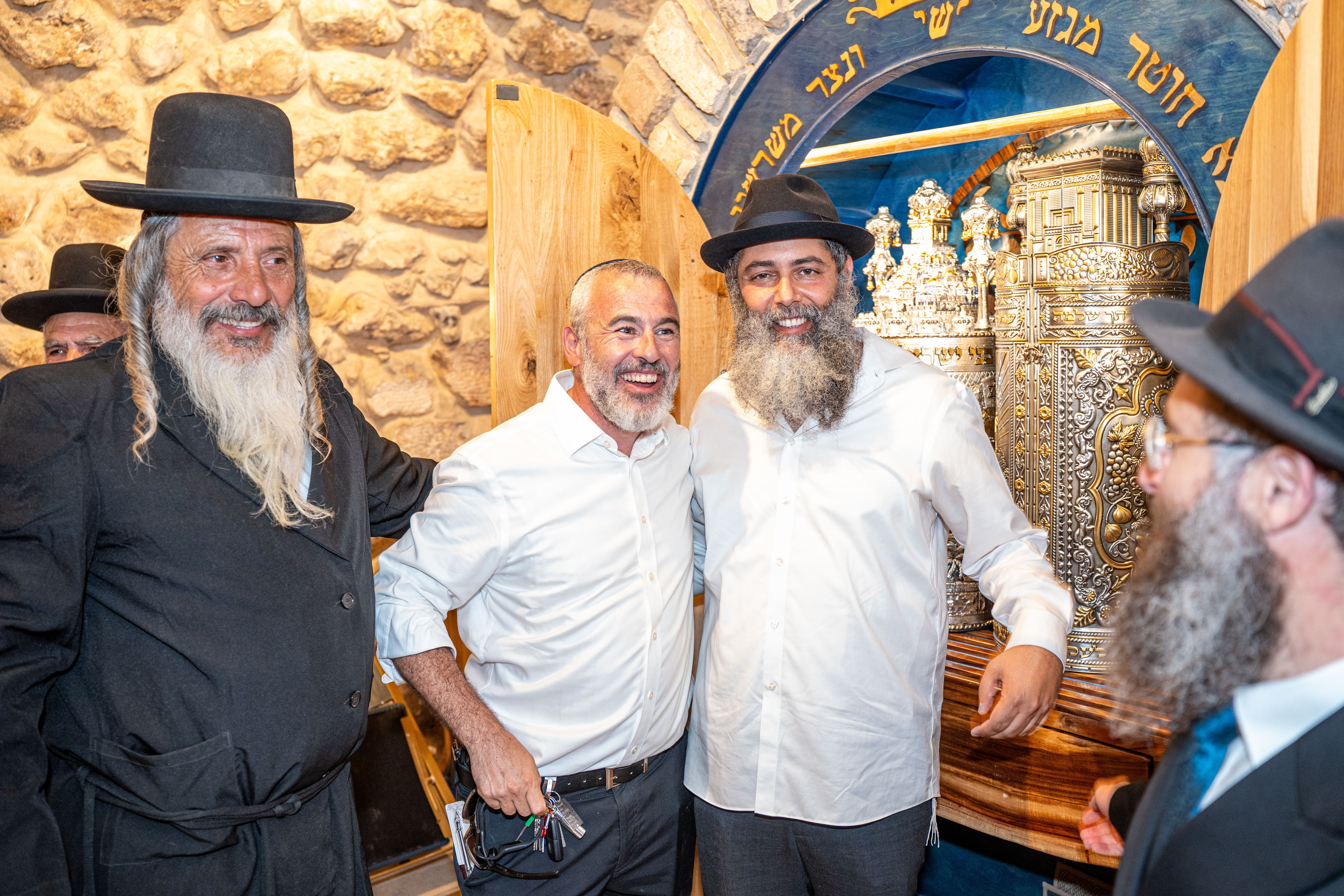
Bringing a new Torah into the synagogue of Tomb of Jesse and Ruth, Hebron

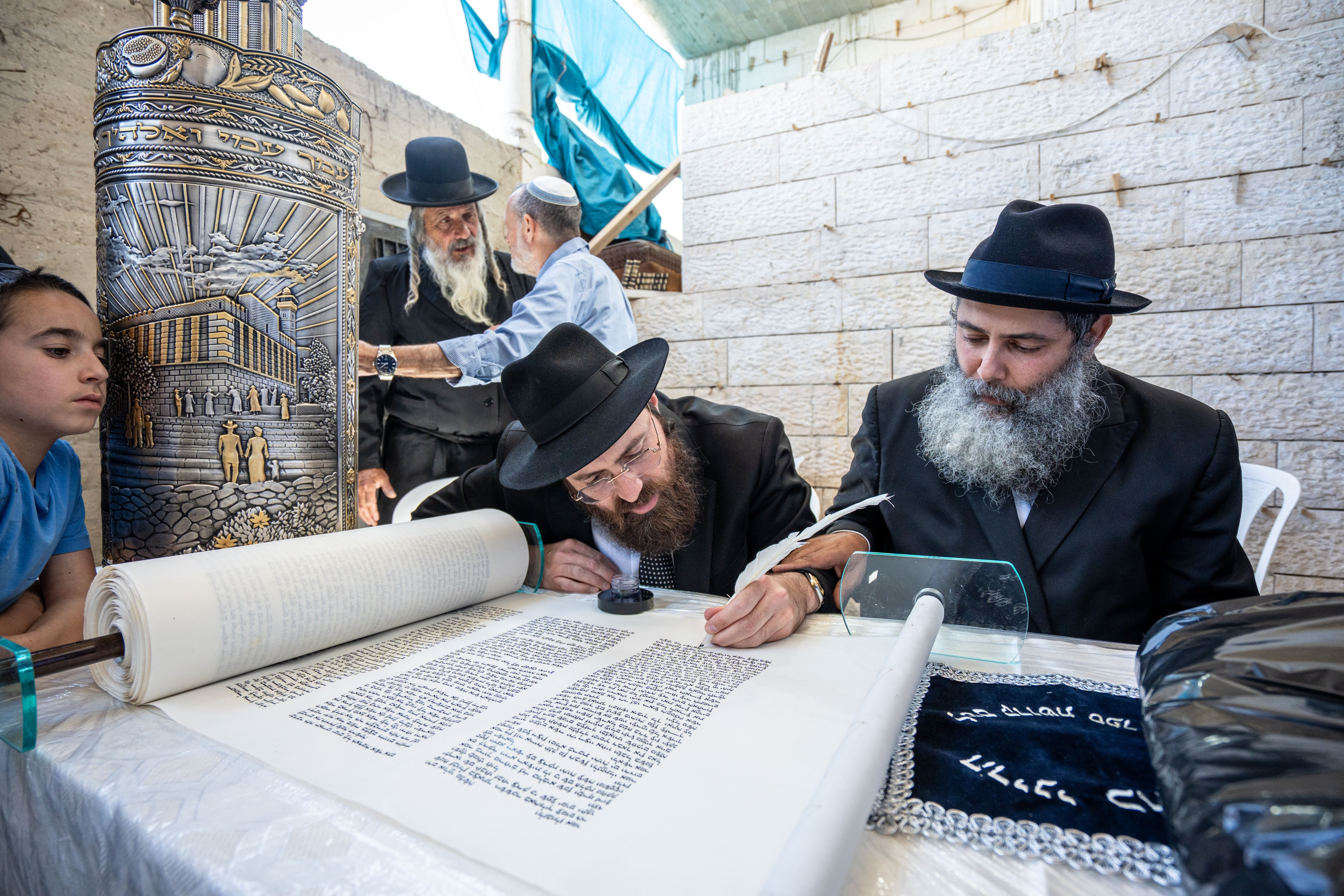
Completion of writing a Torah scroll at the Tomb of Jesse and Ruth, Hebron

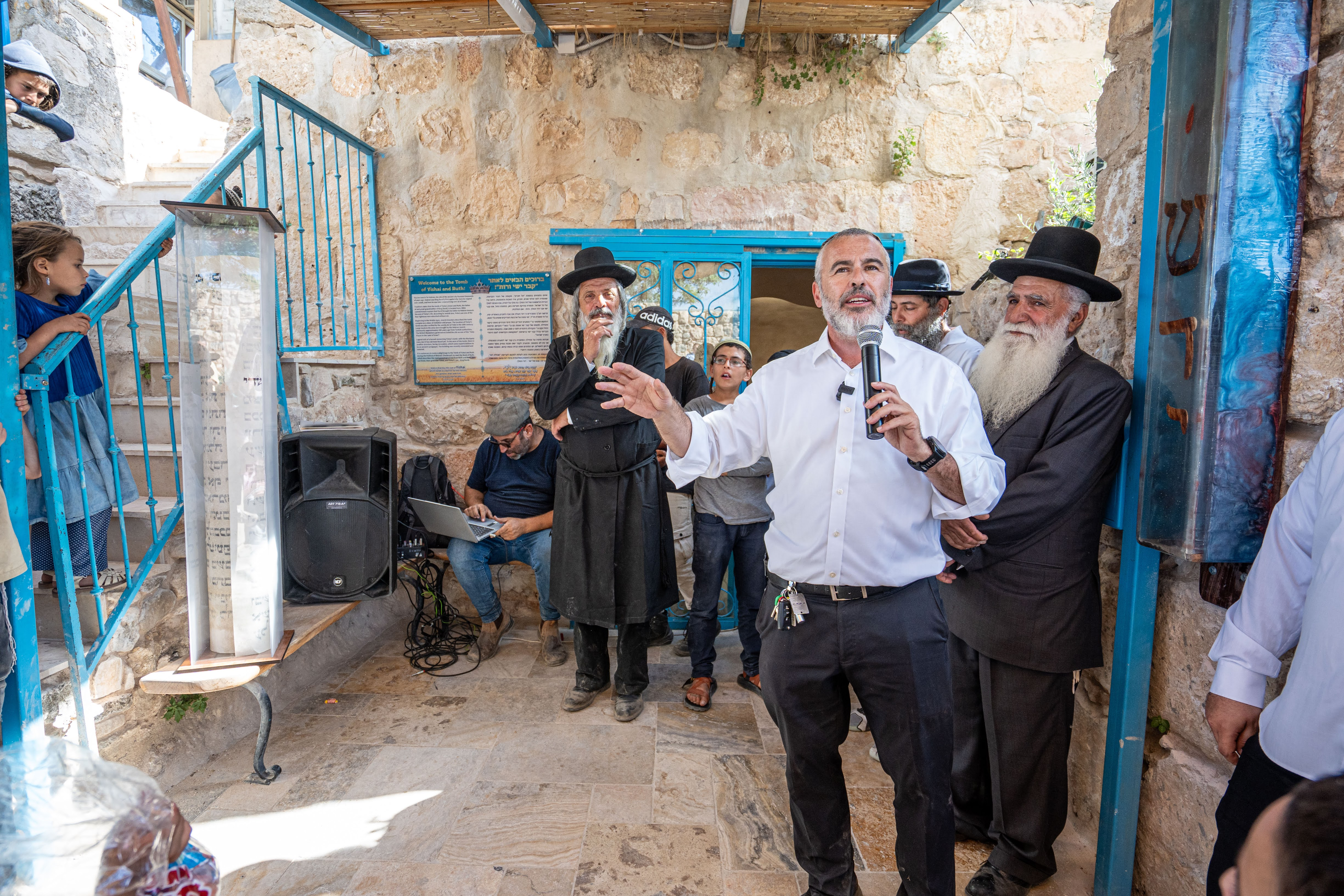
Yishai Fleisher speaking at the dedication of the new torah scroll, Tomb of Jesse and Ruth

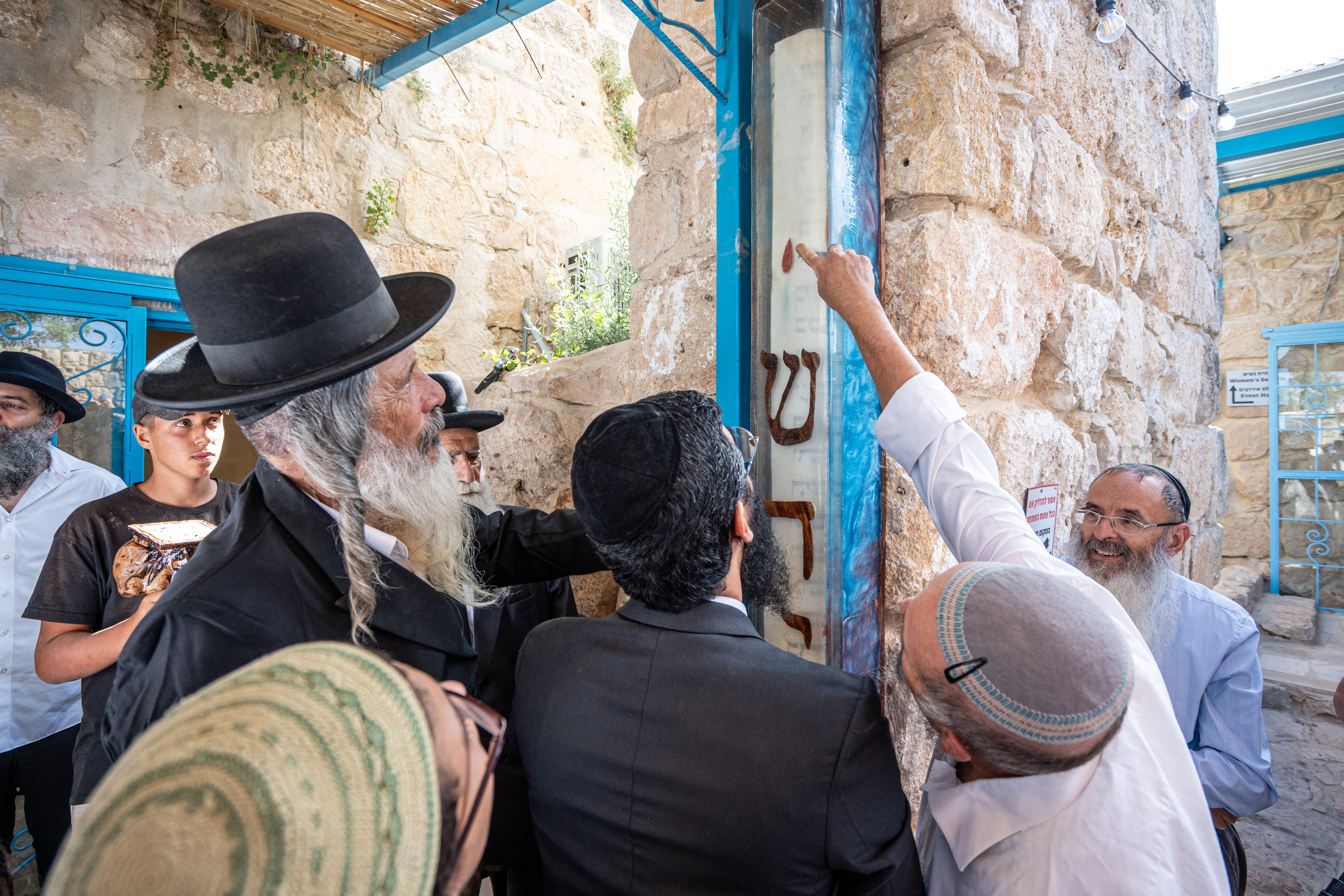
Installing a mezuzah, Tomb of Jesse and Ruth, Hebron

== See also ==
- Ancient synagogues in Israel
- History of the Jews in the Land of Israel
- List of oldest synagogues
