= Harry Chadwick (footballer) =

English footballer

Harold Chadwick
Personal information
- Full name: Harold Chadwick
- Date of birth: 25 January 1919
- Place of birth: Oldham, England
- Date of death: 2 December 1987 (aged 68)
- Place of death: Chadderton, England
- Position: Winger

Senior career*
Years	Team	Apps	(Gls)
1936	Macclesfield Town	2	(0)
1940-1946	Grimsby Town		(6)
1947–1949	Tranmere Rovers	9	(0)
1949-1950	Macclesfield Town	8	(1)
1947	Ashton United		
1949	Goslings		
- * Club domestic league appearances and goals

Harold Chadwick (25 January 1919 – 2 December 1987) was an English footballer, who played as a winger in the Football League for Grimsby Town and Tranmere Rovers.
