= H. Beatty Chadwick =

American prisoner

H. Beatty Chadwick (born 1936) is the current American record holder for the longest time being held in civil contempt of court, having spent fourteen years in prison.

In 1992, Chadwick entered divorce proceedings with his wife, Barbara Chadwick. Chadwick claimed he had transferred $2.5 million to a debt in Gibraltar; however, in 1994, after the discovery that he had bought and redeemed three annuity contracts using $869,000 from Gibraltar, the Delaware County Court of Common Pleas ruled his transfers were fraudulent. Chadwick refused to follow the subsequent court orders and was arrested in 1995 on a bench warrant for contempt. During his arrest, he was also convicted of assault for resisting arrest.

He was incarcerated until such time as he could present $2.5 million to the Delaware County Court in Pennsylvania. Chadwick maintained that the money was lost in bad investments and therefore he could not surrender money he did not possess.

In 2005, due to his assault conviction, Chadwick was suspended from the practice of law for five years.

On July 10, 2009, Chadwick was ordered released from prison by Delaware County Judge Joseph Cronin, who determined his continued incarceration had lost its coercive effect and would not result in him surrendering the money.
