= Tel Rumeida =

Archeological, agricultural and residential area in Hebron

Coordinates: 31.524°N 35.104°E

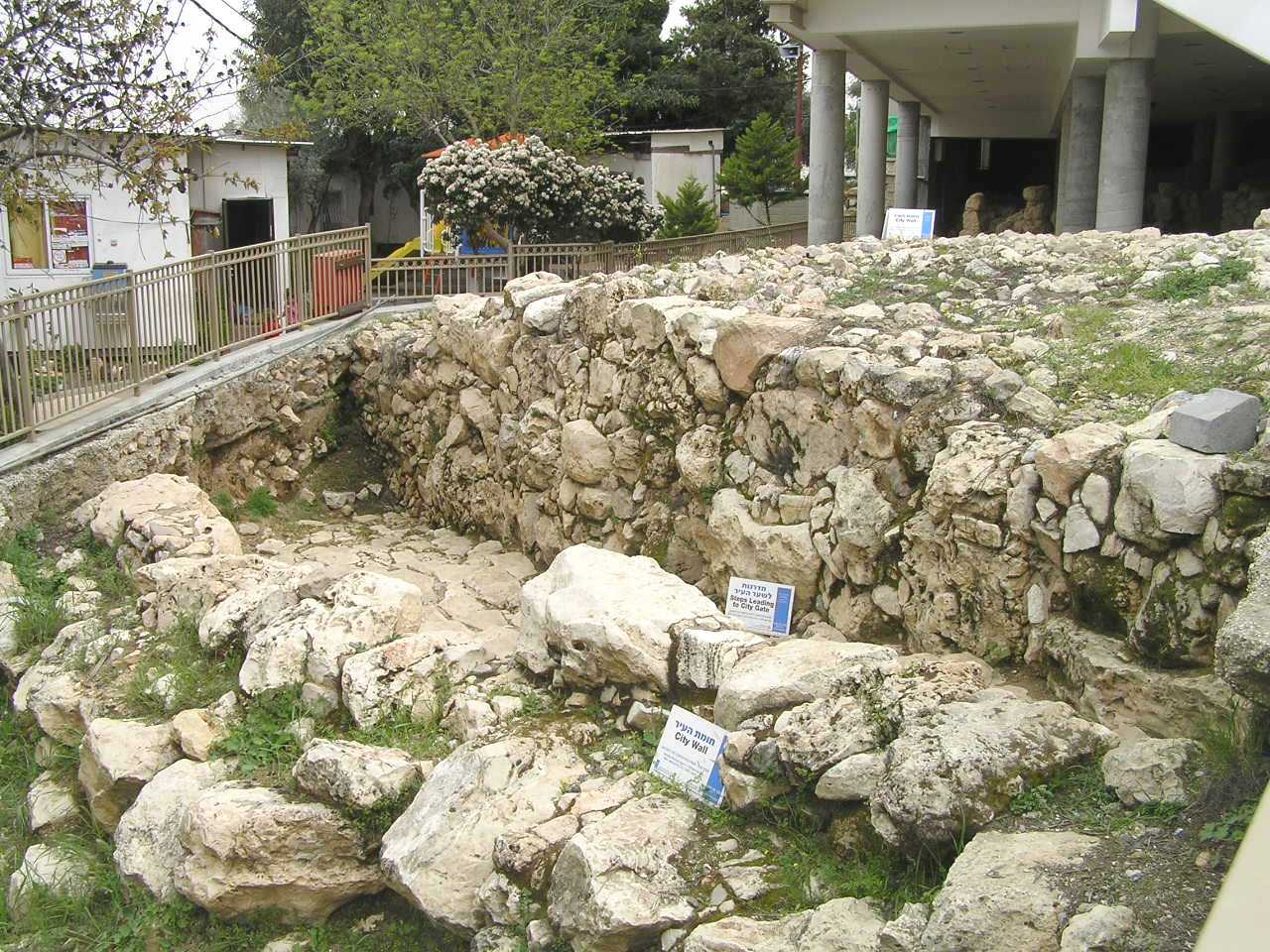
Excavations at Tel Rumeida

2019 map by the United Nations Office for the Coordination of Humanitarian Affairs, showing the humanitarian impact of Israeli settlements in Hebron city. Tel Rumeida is shown in the "Closed Military Area"

Tel Rumeida (Arabic: تل رميدة; Hebrew: תל רומיידה), also known as Jabla al-Rahama and Tel Hebron is an archaeological, agricultural and residential area in the West Bank city of Hebron. Within it, lies a tell whose remains go back to the Chalcolithic period, and is thought to constitute the Canaanite, Israelite and Edomite settlements of Hebron mentioned in the Hebrew Bible and Second Temple period literature.

While most of the site's area is used as an agricultural land, it is also the location of a Palestinian neighbourhood and an Israeli settlement. The international community considers Israeli settlements in the West Bank illegal under international law, but the Israeli government disputes this.

== Topological description ==
Tel Rumeida is an agricultural and residential location on a slope to the west of Hebron's old quarter, running down east from Jebel Rumeida (from which it takes its name). On the east there is a spring, 'Ain Judēde. It lies at the edge of the administrative H2 zone and extends into a Palestinian quarter. Several Palestinian homes lie on the tel's apex, a further cluster lies north, and to the east by Ein Jadide ('Ain Judēde). Lower down, to the north-east, are three parallel thick-walled vaults called es-Sakawati, and slightly further east the tomb of Sheikh al-Mujahid/Abu es-Sakawati.

Much of the land is owned or worked by several Palestinian families, among them the Natshe and Abu Haikals. Three lots of land are regarded as in Jewish ownership, having been purchased in the 19th century by the old Jewish Hebronite community: 2, lots 52 and 53, to the north, and one the south side. The Jewish settlement is called Jesse's Lands (Admot Yishai). Er-Rumeidy, a Jewish Karaite cemetery containing around 500 tombs, is located to the north-west.

== Archaeology ==
Tel Rumeida is the site of the ancient city of Hebron. Denys Pringle suggests that the site excavated 200–300 m (660–980 ft) east of the hilltop mosque represents the old Kiryat Arba described by the Dominican pilgrim Burchard of Mount Sion in 1293 as "vetus civitas quondam Cariatharbe dicta". The occupational sequence of the settlement is very similar to Jerusalem's.

=== Chalcolithic ===
The settlement dates back to at least the Chalcolithic period, c. 3500 BCE.

=== Bronze Age ===
==== Early Bronze III ====
During the Early Bronze III (EB; 2800–2500 BCE) the settlement expanded, with a fortified area extending over 30 dunams. This settlement was subsequently abandoned.

==== Middle Bronze ====
It was reoccupied and rebuilt in the Middle Bronze I–II periods (2000–1600), and girded by cyclopean walls built with stones measuring 3 m (9.8 ft) by 5 m (16 ft).

A cuneiform economic text, with 4 personal names and a list of animals, unearthed at the site and dated 17–16 century BCE indicates Tel Rumeida/Hebron was composed of a multicultural pastoral society of Hurrians and Amorites, run by an independent administrative system with its palace scribes perhaps under kingly rule.

==== Late Bronze ====
The Late Bronze Age (LBA; 1500–1200) levels have yielded signs of a settlement, including pottery, domestic structures and a scarab of Ramesses II, while the previous Middle Bronze city wall was still in use. According to Jericke, neither Tel Rumeida nor the surrounding Hebron area show signs of a major settlement at this time, throughout this period, when the centre of the region was located in biblical Debir/Khirbet Rabud. Chadwick, however, argues that archaeological findings indicate that Tel Rumeida was a thriving city throughout the Late Bronze period.

=== Iron Age ===
==== Iron I ====
Tel Rumeida was also settled during Iron Age I and IIA (1200–1000), with structures attesting to a walled settlement in the transition from LBA to IA1. Ofer infers on the basis of some material excavated to the north that this was a "Golden Age for Hebron", characterized by intensive settlement (11–10th centuries BCE). This Iron I city may have been destroyed by Sheshonq I during his campaign in the late-10th century BCE.

==== Iron II ====
Findings attest to a third phase of settlement from the Iron Age IIA, when Hebron formed part of the Kingdom of Judah, until its destruction during Sennacherib's campaign. Signs of this settlement above the EBIII and MBII fortified city are 8th-century BCE four-room houses, granaries and LMLK seal stamps "for the king, Hebron" (lmlk ḫbrn) on jar handles. Fragments of jars and burnished vessels may suggest that there was a small-scale occupation. Some Bronze Age fortifications were enhanced in the Iron IIB period, possibly by King Hezekiah in anticipation of the Assyrian invasion. After the destruction of this city, a new Iron IIC settlement was established in the second half of the 7th century BCE.

=== Babylonian and Persian periods ===
The last Israelite settlement at Tel Rumeida was destroyed in 586 BCE, and the town's population city became predominantly Edomite throughout the subsequent Babylonian and Persian periods.

=== Hellenistic, Roman and Byzantine periods ===
In 167 BCE, this Idumean settlement, attested during Hellenistic times was devastated by Judah Maccabee who wrecked its fortress walls, leaving only a gate tower. The Edomite survivors moved downhill to relocate in Machpelah, to remain the majority population of Hebron down to Roman times.

During the 2014 excavations, Lot 53 yielded a large, Early Roman period large compound.

The Late Roman period sees a new settlement (3–4th centuries CE) that survived into the Byzantine period, by which time the centre of the city moved from Tel Rumeida to what is now the Old City of Hebron.

== Deir Al Arba'een ==
On the top of Tel Rumeida (Jabal Rumeida) are the ruins of the Deir Al Arba'een complex which contains three distinct edifices, consisting of two ruins and a tomb complex. The PEF Survey of Palestine described it as "a modern Arabic work on older foundations". The Deir al-Arba'een was, according to Platt, probably built to fulfill two functions, that of a fortress and government building. One tomb is known as the Tomb of Jesse and Ruth, and another as the tomb the Tomb of as-Saqawātī.

=== Tomb of Jesse and Ruth ===
The Jewish settlers of Hebron, carrying on an earlier Hebronite Jewish tradition of reverence for the place, view Deir Al Arba'een as the ancient burial site of two biblical figures: Jesse, father of David, and Ruth the Moabite, David's great-grandmother. The tombs ascribed to Jesse and Ruth are visited frequented, especially during Shavuot, by Jews and converts to Judaism who come to pay homage for Ruth. Over time, the site has also functioned as a small informal prayer space, reflecting its role in contemporary religious practice alongside its traditional identification. Limited maintenance and minor improvements were carried out intermittently, though the site remained relatively undeveloped for much of the late 20th century. A Torah scroll placed inside it by settlers has been removed by the IDF, and the site was vandalized in 2007. Left-wing archaeological critics view the excavations on the site as pretexts for expanding the settlement—the City of David (Ir David) and Susya are compared—a form of 'annexation in the guise of archaeology'.

=== The tomb of as-Saqawātī ===
Lower down the hill there are 3 parallel vaults in an olive grove, at the eastern end of which is a tomb called as-Saqawātī. It stands next to a mulberry tree bearing an Arabic inscription which refers to a certain Sayyid, or lineal descendant of Mohammad, by the name Muḥammad Ibn ‘Abdallah al-Ḥusayni, from whom a Hebronite clan, the Āl ash-Sharīf, claim descent, saying he was a Maghrebi Arab from the as-Sāqiyah al-Ḥamrā’, from which his nisba, or onomastic for place of descent, seen in the tomb's local name, Saqawātī, is derived. According to this narrative, the person arrived in Jerusalem with Saladin in 1187, taught at the Al-Aqsa Mosque and then settled in Hebron. Moshe Sharon suspects this story to be a fabrication by the clan. A local legend has it that the structure lies in the open because all roofs built over it would collapse. The site is still a place for prayers, especially in times of drought.

== Property claims ==
=== 1807–1967 ===
In 1807, Rabbi Haim Yeshua Hamitzri (Haim the Jewish Egyptian), a Sephardic Jewish immigrant from Egypt, purchased 5 dunams on the periphery of the Old City of Hebron, and, in 1811, signed two lease contracts for 800 dunams of land, among which were 4 plots at Tel Rumeida. The duration of the lease was 99 years. Since his descendant Haim Bajaio, the last Sephardic rabbi in the city, administered it after the Jews were evacuated from Hebron, it is believed that the lease must have been renewed. These properties were appropriated by the Jordanian government in 1948, and the Israeli government in 1967.

=== Jewish claims since 1967 ===
It is on the basis of the original lease taken out for 99 years by Haim Yeshua Hamitzri that the current Jewish settlers, none of whom is related to the original lessee, then asserted a claim to the land in Tel Rumeida, a claim dismissed by Haim Hanegbi, a founder of Matzpen, who argues that settlers in Hebron have no right to speak in the name of the old Jewish families of the city.

The Israeli Supreme Court ruled in 2011 that Jews have no right to properties they possessed in places like Hebron and Tel Rumeida before 1948.

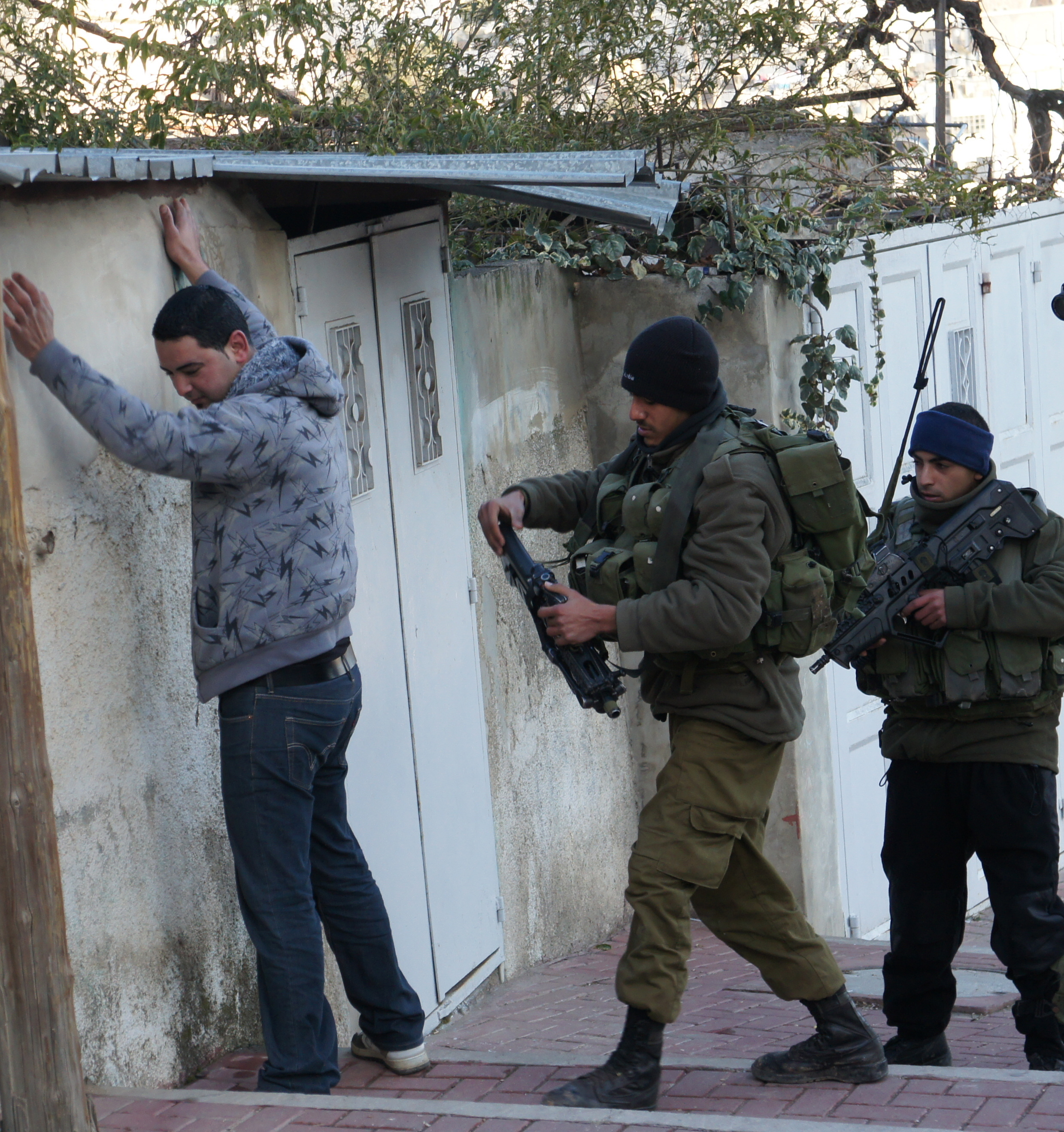
Palestinians are routinely searched by Israeli soldiers as they pass Tel Rumeida

=== Arab claims ===
According to the Abu Heikal family, they rented the land from Jordanian government's Custodian of Enemy Property. After 1967, a new lease was signed with Israeli government's Custodian of Absentee Property. The Custodian refused to accept the Abu Heikal's rent payments in 1981, but, after an agreement was renegotiated in 2000, the back rent for 1981–2000 was reportedly paid up by the family, and fees were regularly accepted for the following 2 years, after which the land was declared a closed military zone, rent payments were rejected and the family was refused further access.

The Abu Heikal's land is subject to increasing encroachment by settlers on the basis of an archaeological claim. Summer water delivery was secured by purchases frem the Hebron municipal water truck until frequent smashing of its windows by settlers forced the council to cancel the deliveries. Christian Peacemaker volunteers who tried to accompany the trucks were detained and received death threats.

In 2005, an Israeli settler company with Jordanian registration, Tal Construction & Investments LTD, took over a 0.75 acre property, whose owners, the Bakri family, had been forced to move out of during the Second Intifada. The company produced documents to the effect that it had legally purchased the property, for $300,000, from a certain Hani Naji al-Batash who in turn claimed he had bought the property from the original owners. A police investigation that year determined that al-Batash had no rights to the area, and that the documents used for the sale transaction were forged. The Bakri family appealed through various Israeli legal venues, with a court recognizing that they had proven they had never sold the contested property, a verdict confirmed by the Israeli Supreme Court in 2014. The company appealed claims rights from Ottoman law and compensation, but in 2019 all settler claims were rejected. The Jerusalem District court rejected an appeal by the construction company, which was ordered to pay the Palestinian owners 579,600 shekels ($166,000) in usage fees. On appeal the sum was reduced by 80,000 shekels due to the settlers' improvements, while it was ruled that the Bakri family be paid 15,000 shekels for expenses incurred. The settlers were evicted.

== Israeli settlement ==
The Ramat Yeshai settlement started in 1984, set up by settlers from Hebron who established 6 portable caravans at Deir Al Arba'een. The initiative obtained official Israeli approval in 1998, and the Israel Defense Ministry gave the go-ahead for building 16 housing units on the site in 2001. Since then the land adjacent to the settlement is being incrementally taken over, notwithstanding stop-work orders handed down in judgements from the Israeli Supreme Court. Both the Abu Haikal and Abu Aisha families had saved and protected Jews from the slaughter of other Arabs during the 1929 Hebron massacre and the Israeli Interior Minister Yosef Burg had, according to Abu Aisha, specifically asked settlers not to harm the Abu Aisha for this reason in the early 80s. According to Ehud Sprinzak , an Israeli counterterrorism specialist and expert in far-right Jewish groups, "a small number of very radical Jewish families" settled in the area in the mid-1980s. According to Muhammad Abu Aisha, relations with the original settlers were amicable until the arrival of two Kahanists, Baruch Marzel and Noam Federman who took up residence there. On Marzel's arrival at Tel Rumeida he began to promote the ultra-nationalist Kahanist ideology, outlawed by Israeli law.

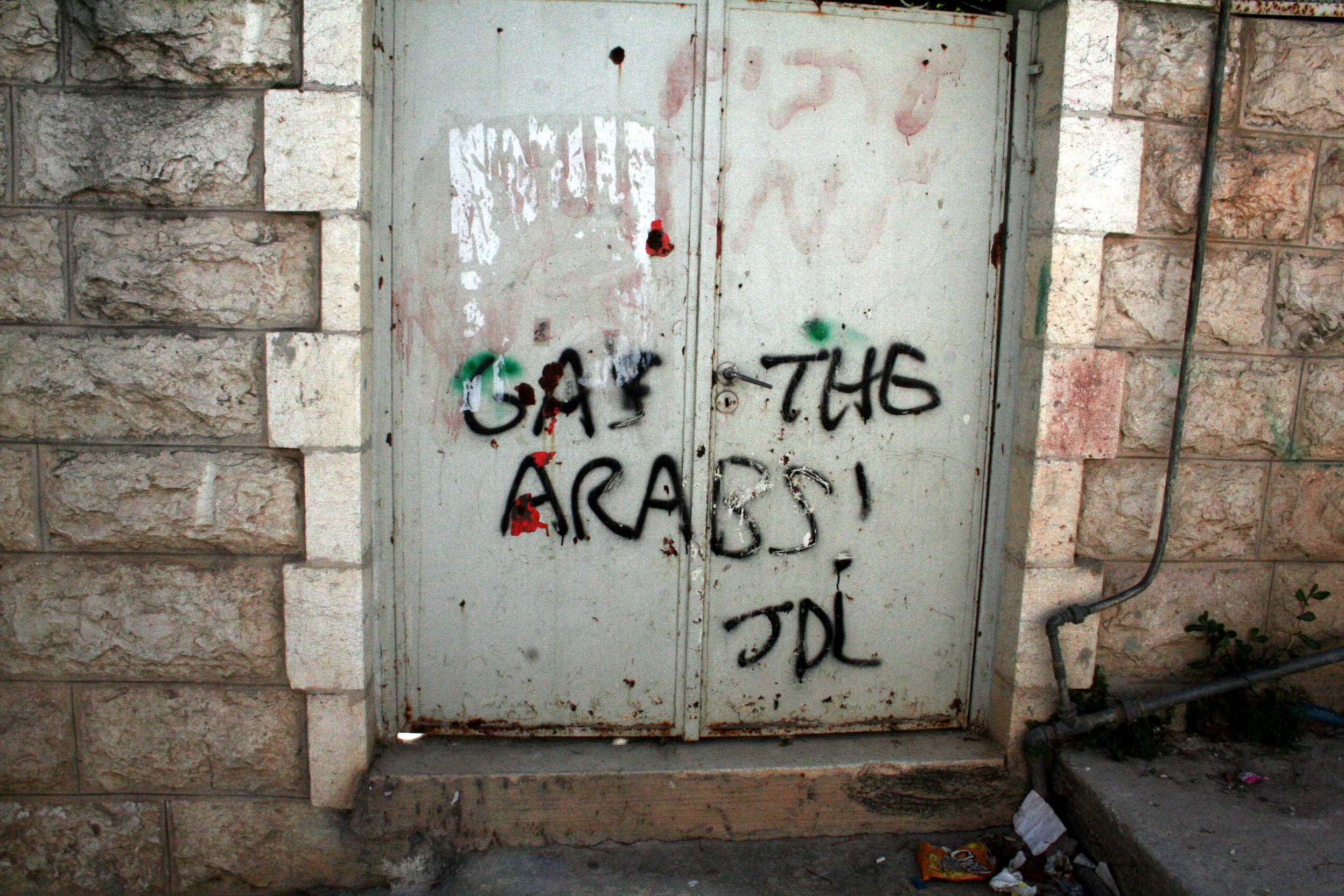
Graffiti in Hebron, in the Israeli-occupied West Bank, calling for the gassing of Arabs, above a tag for the right-wing group the Jewish Defense League

Settlers are said to purposefully provoke Palestinian residents: numerous testimonies of continuous harassment have been collected from several Palestinian families such as the Abu 'Aisha, the Shamsiyeh, whose 8-year-old daughter's hair was reportedly set alight by a settler, and the Azzeh. Peace activists stationed in the area report frequent threats or acts of settler stoning at both activists and local residents who venture there, or who try to work their lands. Palestinians cannot adequately defend themselves, because the settlement is defended by an entire company of the Israeli Defense Force. An English graffiti reading 'Gas the Arabs', said to be the handiwork of the Jewish Defense League, has been sprayed on one of the streets.

Under Yitzhak Rabin, the Israeli government proposed closing down the settlement at Tel Rumeida after the Cave of the Patriarchs massacre. Far-right rabbis moved to block evacuation of the settlements by issuing an Halakhic ruling against removal of settlements in Eretz Israel. The collective influence of the settlers and their Rabbis, in what one scholar has called, 'one of the most effective mobilization efforts in settler history,' persuaded Prime Minister Rabin to back down. The Dir al-Arba'in mosque, where Hebronite Palestinians had prayed until the mid-1990s, was declared a closed military zone, and converted into a synagogue, renamed by settlers Tomb of Ruth and Jesse, and thenceforth all access to it by Muslims was forbidden ostensibly for security reasons. According to Karin Aggestam, attempts to convert the mosque into a Jewish shrine, including painting its door blue, are in violation of the Hebron Protocol, which committed both Israel and Palestine to preserving and protecting the historic character of the city without harm or changes. During the Al-Aqsa Intifada, the Jewish settlement came under regular fire from Palestinian militants.

In 2005, violence against Palestinians in Hebron most frequently originated with the settlement at Tel Rumeida. The Abu Haikel family is reported to be harassed many times. Of the original 500 Palestinian families resident there, only 50 had remained after what Gideon Levy called a 'reign of terror'. Palestinian cars are torched. Long curfews, restrictions on Palestinian movements in the area, and the difficulty of sending children to school like the local Qurtuba (Cordoba) elementary school whose main entrance was sealed with razor wire by the IDF in 2002 and whose students are subject to settler stoning, have, according to one testimony, forced residents in the Palestinian neighbourhood to abandon their homes, and a grocery business and a small hospital to close. Palestinian vehicles are forbidden on Tel Rumeida's streets, and Arab residents can only move in the area on foot. Visits by the International Committee of the Red Cross to check the conditions of Palestinian residents are met by vandalism of vehicles: the flags are stolen, and the emblems on cars damaged since apparently the symbol of the Christian cross is considered 'offensive' to Jewish settlers in the area. B'tselem has a project to provide Palestinians with videos to capture violence against them, and one of the best known videos in the series deals with the harassment Palestinian residents of Tel Rumeida are subject to. According to David Dean Shulman, Palestinian residents have opened a Center for Sumud and Challenge, where the virtue of non-violent resistance and steadfast perseverance (sumud) in the face of harassment is advocated. Situated close to Admot Yishai, the centre, run by Youth Against Settlements (YAS), was subject to an arson attempt in 2013.

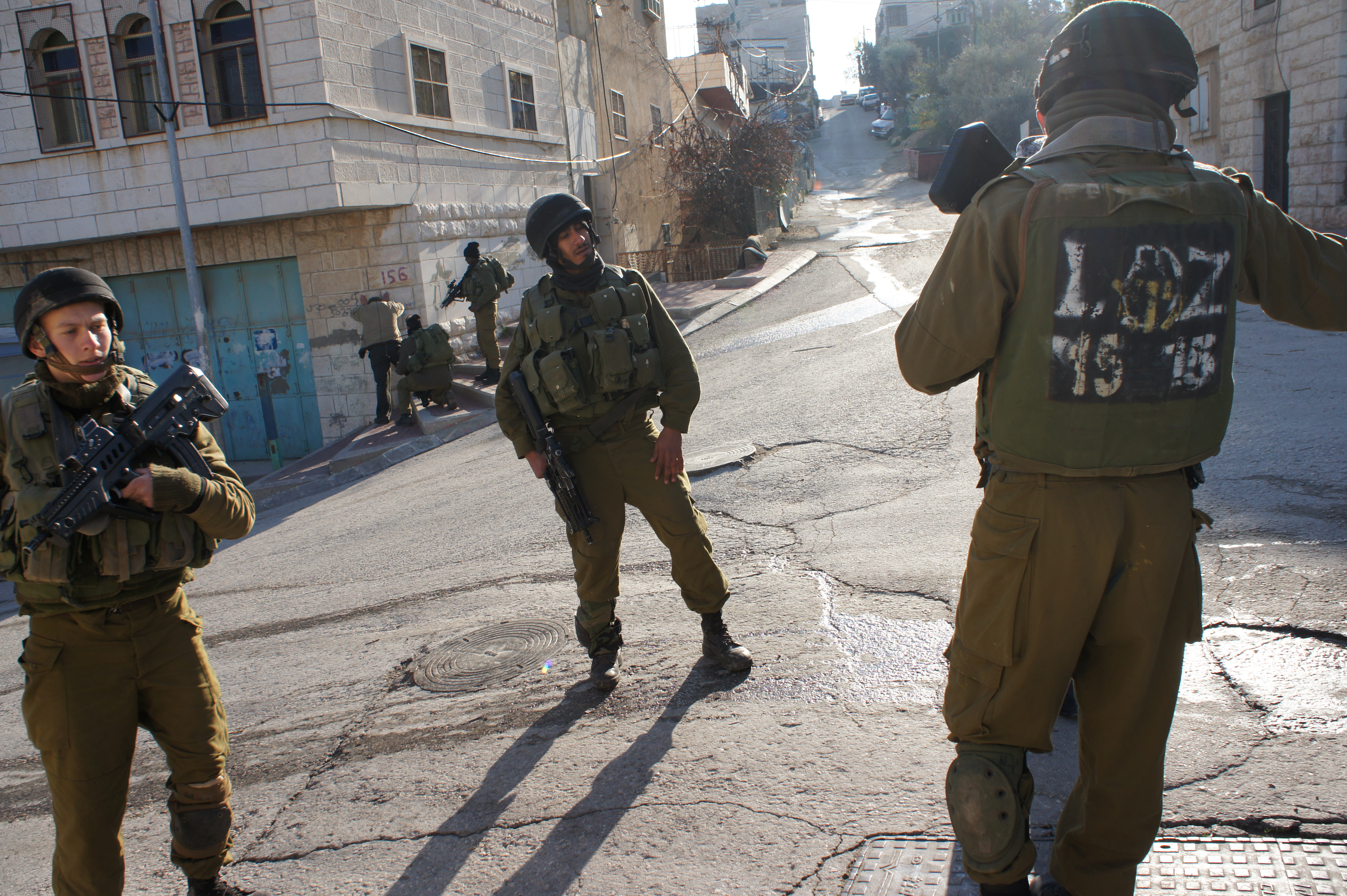
Golani soldiers search Palestinians routinely as they pass Tel Rumeida

A Palestinian resident who refused lucrative offers for her home, has stated that settlers have used home-made napalm to poison their fields, continually burn their cars, and destroy their agricultural tools. In 2011, according to Christian Peacemaker Teams, a further 16 trees from the Haikal's olive groves, some of them reputedly 1,000 years old, were destroyed by fire when settlers set them alight. Palestinian firefighter teams trying to extinguish the flames had their hoses confiscated, and replaced by older ones. Settlers reportedly uprooted roughly 100 olive-tree saplings planted with the help of a Jordanian NGO in the yard of a Palestinian school in Tel Rumeida.

In 2012 an Israeli court ruled that settler claims to have purchased a house in Tel Rumedia in 2005, which had been abandoned by its owner Zechariah Bakri in 2001 when restrictions were imposed on Palestinian movements, were based on forgeries. The house, occupied by 6 settler families, was under a court order requiring them to evacuate it.

At 6 a.m. on 6 November, Israeli forces occupied several Palestinian homes and the Beit Sumoud headquarters of the Youth Against Settlements, detaining residents while declaring that their occupation of the dwellings would continue for 24 hours. Palestinian TV crews were reportedly prevented from documenting the incident. Subsequently, the 50 Palestinian families who refuse to leave Tel Rumeida were required to have ID cards permitting them to move in the area: no one else will be permitted to enter the zone. Subsequently, the IDs of Tel Rumeida and Shuhada Street were stamped with numbers, a practice which led to protests by Palestinians who stated 'Israel is the last place in the world that should give people numbers'. The measure, reportedly a local measure, was revoked when higher echelon commanders reviewed the practice.

In late November 2015 Baruch Marzel led a settler assault, demanding the closure of the Beit Sumoud, and engaged in a sit-in occupying its seats, on 28 November.

In July 2016 an attempt by local Tel Rumeida Gandhian-style peace activist Issa Amro, and Jawad Abu Aisha, the owner of an old factory to clean up the site and establish infrastructure for a cultural cinema project was blocked by soldiers. Amro had called on Jewish activists to help them, trusting that their presence and privilege would ensure them the few hours require to clear the area and set up a film center. Some 52 mainly diaspora activists, many from religious backgrounds, turned up. Settlers reportedly started tomatoes at them, and the army then detained 15 activists. Subsequently, a military closure was imposed on the site.

== Fatal incidents ==
- On 1 July 1995 Ibrahim Khader Idreis (16), while on a visit from Jordan to Tel Rumeida relatives, after stepping outside to buy bread, was shot dead by Baruch Marzel and an IDF soldier. Palestinian residents say he had been ordered to stop by Marzel, and shot in the leg and chest when he didn't. A soldier nearby then shot him in the stomach. The IDF later claimed he had tried to stab the soldier, though no knife was ever produced. Marzel testified that he had acted after the boy threw a stone at him.
- On 21 August 1998, Rabbi Shlomo Ra'anan, the grandson of Abraham Isaac Kook and protégé of Zvi Yehuda Kook, was stabbed and killed by a Hamas operative in his trailer home at Tel Rumeida. The attacker then set the house on fire by throwing a Molotov cocktail. The incident determined Prime Minister Benjamin Netanyahu to approve construction in Tel Rumeida, which was premised on preliminary archaeological work. By the time the excavations had been completed, a different Prime Minister, Ehud Barak, was in power and refused to issue the necessary building permits. These were eventually forthcoming after the election of Ariel Sharon during the Al-Aqsa Intifada.
- On 21 October 2015, a local resident, physician Hashem al-Azzeh (54) was reportedly denied an ambulance while suffering from cardiac problems. On walking down to the Bab al-Zawiye checkpoint, he was forced to stop and breathed in tear-gas from local clashes, collapsed and died soon afterwards. His wife reportedly had suffered two miscarriages from settler attacks and a 9-year-old nephew had had his teeth smashed in by a rock thrown by a settler.
- On 24 March 2016 a resident, shoemaker Imad Abu Shamsiya, was subject to a barrage of abuse and received threats after filming a video of fatally shooting a Palestinian, who had been lying wounded after stabbing an Israeli soldier, outside Abu Shamsiya's home in Tel Rumeida. An Israeli interrogator reportedly asked him to deny he had filmed the incident, and warned him of the danger he had placed himself among settlers for revealing his identity as the person who filmed the incident. His house was subject to a night-time raid by Israeli forces to check identity papers after Palestinian and international activists blockaded themselves inside after settlers reportedly threatened to burn it. Itamar Ben-Gvir and Ben-Zion Gopstein later filed a complaint with police against Shamsiya claiming he had coordinated with the terrorists in order to get the incident on film. Elor Azariya, the soldier who executed the wounded Palestinian, testified at his trial that "Hebron is a really tense city. there is always a feeling of tension in the air, especially in Tel Rumeida, which is where there is the most friction between Palestinians and Jews anywhere in the world. It's a stressful place."

== Foreign relations ==
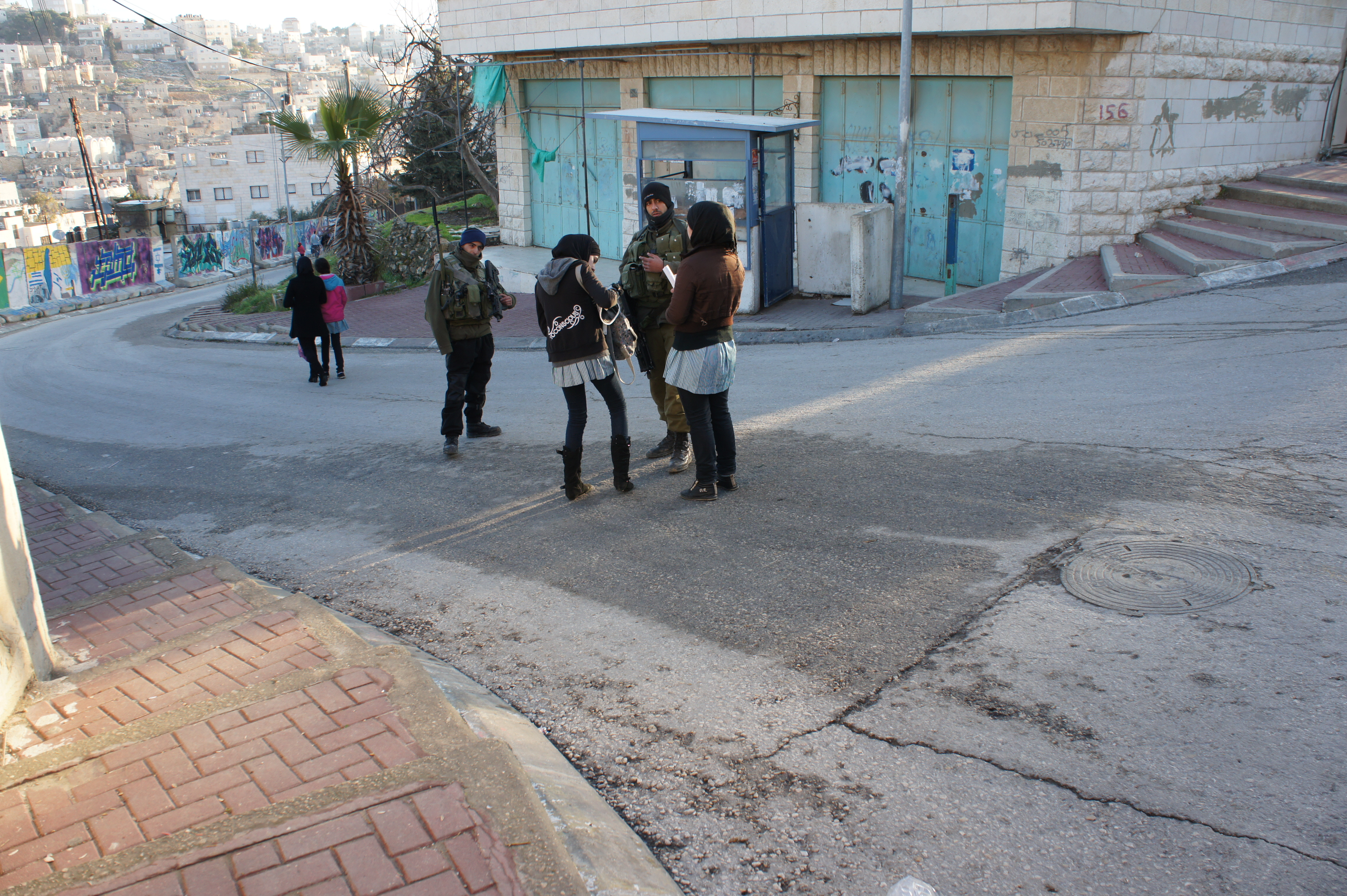
Israeli soldiers checking Palestinian school-girls in Tel Rumaida

Nobel Prize winning novelist Mario Vargas Llosa made a tour of Tel Rumeida in 2005, during which he chanced to meet the Israeli journalist Gideon Levy. He recorded his impressions first in the newspaper El País. What struck Llosa was the resilience of the 50 Palestinian families, out of 500, who had managed to remain in Tel Rumeida in the face of 'a ferocious, systematic persecution by settlers'. The latter:

throw stones at them, toss rubbish and excrement on their homes; organize raids to invade and devastate their houses, assault their children as the latter return from school while Israeli soldiers look on with total indifference. No one told me about this: I saw it all with my own eyes, heard it with my own ears from the mouths of the victims themselves. I possess a video which shows a hair-raising scene where the boys and girls of the Tel Rumeida settlement hurl stones and kick Arab students and their schoolmistresses at the local Cordoba school, who, to give each other protection, return to their houses in groups, never alone. When I spoke of these facts with my Israeli friends, some stared at me with incredulity and I noted in their eyes the suspicion that I was either exaggerating or lying, as novelists are wont to do. The fact of the matter is that none of them has ever been to Hebron or ever read Gideon Levy's articles, someone whom they regard indeed as a typical example of the 'Jew-hating and anti-Semitic' Jew.

The American Jewish writer Peter Beinart described one joint Jewish–Palestinian attempt to create a small cinema on an abandoned Palestinian factory in Tel Rumeida. The venture was quickly blocked by an IDF order declaring the site a closed military zone and by the detention of several Jewish activists. Beinart drew an analogy between the work of the local activist Issa Amro and Bob Moses, likening their effort to that of American activists against racial segregation in Mississippi in 1964. He added that:

Why were we performing Kabbalat Shabbat? I can’t speak for everyone, but for me, it was partly to remind myself of who I am. I had spent the day working alongside Palestinians and being protected by them. I had spent the day fearing Jewish soldiers and police. It was a jarring experience. The normal order of things, as I had learned them since childhood, had been turned upside down. Welcoming Shabbat was a way of centering myself. It was a reminder that no matter how many people tell me I hate Judaism, the Jewish people and the Jewish state—no matter how many people tell me I hate myself—I know who I am. I know when I'm living in truth. And nothing feels more Jewish than that.

Beinart announced his intention of getting 500 Jews to join him in at the same area in 2017 to protest the 50th anniversary of the Israeli Occupation of the West Bank.

=== Excavation history ===
Excavations were carried out in the 1960s and in the 1980s at Tel Rumeida in an area where ownership is contested between Palestinian Arabs and Jews, and again in 2014.

==== American Expedition to Hebron (1960s) ====
During the period of Jordanian rule, excavations at the site were undertaken by Philip C. Hammond (1964-1966).

==== Judean Hill Country Expedition (1984–1986) ====
In the wake of Israel's capture of the West Bank in the 1967 Six-Day War, and concomitant occopation, Israeli Prime Minister Yitzhak Rabin authorized archaeological digs on Jewish lots, reportedly to preempt the expansion of settlements there, and these were conducted by the Judean Hill Country Expedition under Avi Ofer.

==== IAA and Ariel University (2014) ====
In 2014, after a lapse of over a decade, the Israel Antiquities Authority (IAA) renewed excavations in the lots with attested Jewish ownership, which extends over a 6 dunam area. This third wave of excavation was undertaken above the settlement of Admot Yishai and between the Palestinian homes, with the intention of creating an archaeological parkland. The new excavations began as a result of a settler initiative, which had been turned down by several prominent Israeli archaeologists, but was accepted by Emanuel Eisenberg of the IAA and David Ben-Shlomo of Ariel University, in a project that secured state funding.

In Lot 52, other than ancient walls and agricultural implements, Muslim tombs were uncovered, and removed from the site.

For Eyal Weizman, Tel Rumeida has become 'the most literal embodiment of the relationship of Israeli settlements to archaeology'. Archaeologist Yonathan Mizrachi argues that settler pressure to create an archaeological park in Tel Rumeida is a technique for taking over the terrain and asserting their power and legitimacy in the area. Dr. Ahmed Rjoub, the Palestinian Authority's director of the Department of Site Management, claims that the excavations have removed artifacts attesting to both the Roman and Islamic heritage.

== Notable residents ==
- Baruch Marzel (born 1959), Israeli far-right politician and activist
- Noam Federman (born 1969), Israeli far-right activist

== See also ==
- Israeli–Palestinian conflict in Hebron
