= Charles Chadwick (cricketer) =

New Zealand cricketer (1880–1942)

Charlie Chadwick
Personal information
- Full name: Charles, Sydney Chadwick
- Born: 1 March 1880; Dunedin, Otago, New Zealand
- Died: 30 October 1942 (aged 62); Dunedin, Otago, New Zealand
- Batting: Left-handed
- Role: Wicket-keeper
- Relatives: Leslie Chadwick (brother)

Domestic team information
- Years: Team
- 1911/12–1924/25: Otago
- Source: ESPNcricinfo, 6 May 2016

Charles Sydney Chadwick (1 March 1880 – 30 October 1942) was a New Zealand cricketer. He played sixteen first-class matches for Otago between the 1912–13 and 1924–25 seasons.

Charlie Chadwick was born at Dunedin in 1880. He played club cricket for the Grange club in the city and played his first match for Otago in 1899 against Southland, but did not make his first-class debut until December 1912 in a match against Canterbury. Playing as the side's wicket-keeper, he recorded a duck in his first innings before scoring eight runs in his second. He played in each of the following two seasons, once in 1913–14 ― top-scoring with 71 not out against Canterbury ― and in three of Otago's four matches during the 1914–15 season.

After serving in the Otago Infantry Regiment during World War I, including overseas from early 1917, Chadwick resumed his cricket career in the 1919–20 season, again playing in three of Otago's four matches. He played in each of the following five seasons and made a total of 16 first-class appearances for Otago. He scored 235 runs and was involved in 28 dismissals. He played for Grange's senior side until giving up his place in the 1930s and later coached the club's junior side. He was the club's secretary for some time and stood as an umpire until ill health forced him to step down in 1941.

Considered a capable wicket-keeper, particularly in his earlier days, who "invariably gave a sound exhibition" behind the stumps, Chadwick was described as "one of the best-known figures in Otago's cricket history" in an obituary in The Star. The paper lauded him as "keen and unselfish" and as "a splendid club man", whilst the Otago Daily Times called him "an enthusiast and a sportsman" who "was one of the game's most popular figures".

Chadwick died in October 1942 at Dunedin after having to go into hospital to undergo an operation. He was aged 62 (Note: A contemporary obituary says that Chadwick was 63 at the time of his death.) and unmarried, running a bookmaking business in the north of Dunedin. His brother, Leslie Chadwick also played for Otago and another brother, Arthur Chadwick, played club cricket for the Albion club in Dunedin.
