= Noam Federman =

Israeli activist (born 1969)

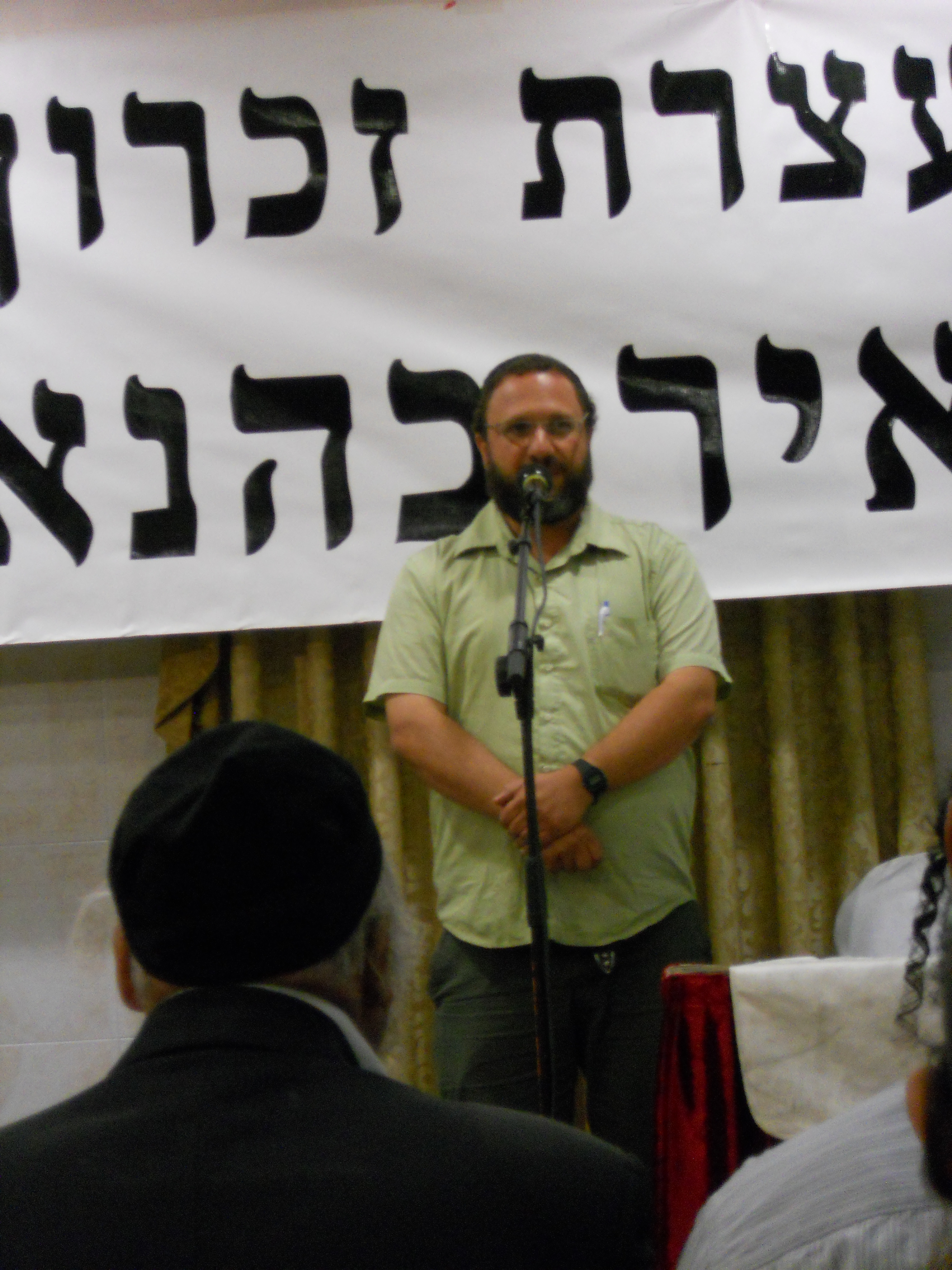
Federman in 2012

Noam Federman (Hebrew: נועם פדרמן; born October 25, 1969, in Jerusalem) is a religious-Orthodox right-wing Israeli Jew in Hebron, and a former leader of the terrorist Kach Party, which he has been involved with since he was 14. He has been held in administrative detention several times, by the Israeli forces, in order to prevent terror against Arabs. Federman hosts a weekly Internet program called "Federman Without Censor". It can be heard on the Hebrew section of the Jewish Task Force's website. JTF funds his political activities in Israel.

== Biography ==
Noam Federman's father, David Federman (1909-1980), a Betar activist turned Lehi fighter, was arrested by the British during the British Mandate for Palestine and interned in Africa for his Jewish nationalist activism, where he shared a cell with Yitzhak Shamir, a future prime minister. Federman was raised on stories of that period, and considers his own beliefs similar to those of Avraham Stern. When he was asked if the similarity between the wartime group's activities and those of his own group was violence against Arabs, he replied, "Hitting the enemy is not a bad thing.”

Federman is a radical settler activist associated with the outlawed Kach party, of which he was one time spokesman. A few hours after news of the assassination of Kach leader Meir Kahane reached Israel, two elderly Palestinians, Mohammed Ali (73) and Mariam Suleiman Hassan (71), were gunned down in an incident ascribed to Kach militants. Federman was quoted as saying that the slayings had been committed as revenge by Kahane supporters, and that more violence was in the pipeline.

After his fellow Hebronite settler Baruch Goldstein machine-gunned 29 Palestinians at prayer in the Cave of the Patriarchs Massacre, Federman paid tribute hailing him as a holy hero, stating 'The act itself was one of greatness. It was a great act of sanctifying the Name (God).' He openly expressed his satisfaction at the assassination of Prime Minister Yitzhak Rabin, and was investigated for incitement against Benjamin Netanyahu after the latter signed accords with the Palestinians, whom he advocates expelling from both the West Bank and Gaza Strip.

On 1 September 1998, Federman was charged on suspicion of having kicked a Hebronite, Mamoun Ja'abri, in the stomach and then spitting on him, and also of assault of a United States Embassy worker.

On 24 May 2002, his brother, Eli Federman, while on duty as a security guard outside the Studio49 Tel Aviv nightclub, shot and killed a suicide car bomber just seconds before he could drive his vehicle into the crowded club, preventing many deaths. Anchorman David Witztum, reporting the incident, contrasted Eli's behavior to that of his radical brother. Eli described his actions thus:

I fired one bullet at him. He fell out of the car and blew up. After the blast, I shot him twice in the head, and then moved closer and emptied the rest of the clip into his head.'

In May 2002, after two men from the Bat Ayin settlement were discovered outside a girls' school in a Palestinian neighborhood on the Mount of Olives with a bomb timed to explode in the morning when students would be arriving, police investigators took six people into custody, including Federman, whom the Shin Bet regarded as "the brain behind this organization". He was subsequently accused of having provided the explosives to be used to blow up the girls school, and put under house arrest for over half a year. All charges were later dropped, Federman was acquitted and he successfully sued the state for false arrest. He was in the news recently after his home and farm, which he had built without a building permit, near Kiryat Arba and Hebron was torn down in the middle of the night.

In November 2005, the Israeli Ministry of Justice expressed its intention to review Federman's application to be licensed as an attorney, claiming that a person with a past as rich with disturbing the peace as his may not be eligible for a license. Federman, addressing the ministry's comment to the press, replied that it was in pattern with the courts' and prosecutor's offices past restrictive behavior towards him that they would now seek to bar him from acquiring the title he worked for as a law student.

In 2008, Federman was indicted for assaulting a policeman, but was acquitted in 2010 after prosecutors failed to show up for the trial, due to a prosecutors' strike.

In 2011, he was arrested by police on suspicion, after he was found to have a goat kid in his possession, that he intended to sacrifice for Passover on the Temple Mount/Haram al-Sharif.

Federman is married to Elisheva. They have nine children. On the occasion of his son Oved's winning a prize for a film about Irgun militant Yehiel Dresner, who was executed by the British Mandate in 1947, Federman said that he is rearing his children on the ideals of the rightist underground movements of the past.

On May 3, 2024, the UK sanctioned Federman as “a radical settler activist and former leader and spokesperson of the now-defunct Kach party, that espoused overtly racist and violent policies" and said Federman trained settlers to commit acts of violence against Palestinians while avoiding repercussions." At the same time, three individuals (Neria Ben Pazi, Elisha Yered, and Eden Levi) and two groups (Hilltop Youth and Lehava) were likewise sanctioned. Federman's son Ely had already been sanctioned by the UK.

== Notable quotes ==
"Revenge is an important value. The Talmud says that it is one of the greatest things. Revenge is great."
