= Robert Chadwick =

Robert Chadwick may refer to:

- Robert Chadwick (sportsman) (1879–1939), New Zealand cricketer and footballer
- Robert Chadwick II, United States Navy admiral
- Robert E. Lee Chadwick (1930–2014), American anthropologist and archeologist
- Robert Chadwick (politician) (1833–1902), American politician from Pennsylvania
- Bob Chadwick (1927–1992), Australian rules footballer

== See also ==
- Robert Burton-Chadwick (1869–1951), shipping magnate and English politician
