= Miles Chadwick =

English footballer

Personal information
- Full name: Miles Chadwick
- Date of birth: 10 March 1880
- Place of birth: Blackburn, England
- Date of death: 1940 (aged 59–60)
- Position: Winger

Senior career*
Years	Team	Apps	(Gls)
1903–1904	Blackburn St Philip's		
1904–1905	Darwen		
1905–1908	Blackburn Rovers	51	(7)
1908	Darwen		
Total		51	(7)
- * Club domestic league appearances and goals

Miles Chadwick (10 March 1880 – 1940) was an English footballer who played in the Football League for Blackburn Rovers.
