= David Chadwick =

David Chadwick may refer to:

- David Chadwick (physician) (1926–2020), American clinical and research pediatrician, author, founder of founder of Chadwick Center for Children and Autism Discovery Institute, San Diego
- David Chadwick (civil servant) (1876–1954), Indian civil servant
- David Chadwick (writer) (1945–2026), American writer on Buddhism
- David Chadwick (footballer) (born 1943), English retired professional footballer
- David Chadwick (politician, born 1821) (1821–1895), British politician, MP (1868–1880)
- David Chadwick (Liberal Democrat politician) (born 1991/1992), British politician, MP (since 2024)
- Dave Chadwick (1930–1960), Grand Prix motorcycle road racer
