= Henry Chadwick =

Henry Chadwick is the name of:

- Henry Chadwick (writer) (1824–1908), early baseball writer
- Henry Chadwick (theologian) (1920–2008), British academic and Church of England clergyman
- Henry Chadwick (journalist) (1866–1934), editor of Seattle weekly newspaper The Argus
- Henry Chadwick (EastEnders), fictional character from BBC TV soap opera EastEnders

== See also ==
- Henry Chadwick Scholfield (1866–1935), Canadian politician, for St. George
- Henry Chadwick Award for baseball researchers
