= Jeffrey R. Chadwick =

American archaeologist

Jeffrey R. Chadwick is an American professional archaeologist and university professor. He serves as Jerusalem Center Professor of Archaeology and Near Eastern Studies at the Brigham Young University Jerusalem Center in Israel, and as Associate Professor of Religious Education at Brigham Young University in Utah, USA. He is also a senior field archaeologist and director of excavations in Area F at the Tell es-Safi/Gath Archaeological Project in Israel.

Chadwick is a native of Ogden, Utah, and a graduate of Ben Lomond High School. He served an LDS mission in West Germany and West Berlin during the mid-1970s. He received a BA in Political Science and German from Weber State College in Ogden, Utah, and an MA in International Relations and Near Eastern Studies from BYU in Provo, Utah. He studied near eastern archaeology, Hebrew, Aramaic, and Egyptian in Israel at Tel Aviv University and the Hebrew University of Jerusalem, and took his PhD in Archaeology and Near Eastern Languages from the University of Utah Middle East Center in Salt Lake City, Utah.

Chadwick began teaching for BYU’s Jerusalem Center programs in 1982, and has taught and researched in Israel annually since then. He has taught in 20 BYU Jerusalem Center student programs, specializing in archaeology and historical geography of the ancient near east, and conducting travel and field study all over Israel, Egypt, Jordan, and Turkey.

Chadwick has also excavated for 20 seasons at various archaeological sites in Israel. During the 1990s he was a senior supervisor with the Tel Miqne/Ekron Archaeological Expedition (directors Seymour Gitin and Trude Dothan) in Israel. He joined the Tell es-Safi/Gath Archaeological Project in Israel (director Aren Maeir) in 2001, and has excavated at the ancient Philistine capital each year since then. He is also director of the American Expedition to Hebron Publication Project, working on finds from the 1960s expedition of Philip C. Hammond at Tell er-Rumeide/Hebron.

Chadwick is a senior research fellow (since 2003) at the W. F. Albright Institute of Archaeological Research in Jerusalem. He also served for six years (2008–2013) on the board of trustees of the American Schools of Oriental Research. Chadwick also taught in the LDS Seminary program during the 1980s, and in the LDS Institute program during the 1990s, at Utah State University and Weber State University. He joined the religion faculty at Brigham Young University in Utah in 2001, where he teaches Bible, Judaism, Islam, and World Religions.

Chadwick has written numerous scholarly and popular articles and book chapters on the archaeology of Israel and the intersection of archaeology and ancient scripture. He has co-authored and co-edited three books, including The Holy Land: A Geographical, Historical, and Archaeological Guide to the Land of the Bible (with D. Kelly Ogden). Chadwick also wrote a popular ebook titled Stone Manger: The Untold Story of the First Christmas.
