= Training School for Betar Instructors =

The Training School for Betar Instructors (or Betar madricihim, also often translated as "youth guides" or "youth leaders") was founded in Tel Aviv in 1928 as a military academy for revisionist youth in British Mandatory Palestine.

Jeremiah Halpern, an experienced activist who had been involved in the Haganah in 1920 and had served Betar in many capacities, was the first director of the school. Halpern had worked with Moshe Rosenberg since the 1920s in the development of Betar's military programmes and together they conceived of a school for Betar madrichim. Shortly after becoming director, Halpern recruited the revolutionary Zionist Abba Ahimeir as an instructor of the nationalist youth and together they led the school in an increasingly radical direction in which military training was viewed as a means of establishing the military wing of a national liberation movement.

Under the leadership of Halpern (and later of Ahimeir), the 24 cadets took the lead in organising demonstrative activities outside Betar, which notably included taking the initiative in the march to the Western Wall in August 1929. The demonstration was later identified as the proximal cause of the 1929 Palestine riots by the Shaw Commission.

Halpern's cadets formed the nucleus for the right-wing Maximalist tendency in Revisionism and the activities of Halpern and Ahimeir contributed to the evolution of the Irgun and to the support of Revisionist Maximalism within Betar.
