= Jeremiah Halpern =

- ירמיהו הלפרן
- Captain Jeremiah Halpern
- Born: 1901; Smolensk, Russia
- Died: 1962 (aged 60–61); Tel Aviv, Israel
- Other names: Yirmiyahu Halpern, Yirmiyahu Halperin
- Occupations: Ship's captain, Revisionist Zionist leader
- Known for: Aide de camp to Ze'ev Jabotinsky, development of Jewish seamanship

Captain Jeremiah Halpern (Hebrew: ירמיהו הלפרן; also known as Yirmiyahu Halpern and Yirmiyahu Halperin) (b. Smolensk, Russia, 1901; d. Tel Aviv, Israel, 1962) was a Revisionist Zionist leader in Palestine who first came to prominence when he served as aide de camp to Ze'ev Jabotinsky in the 1920s when the latter was head of the Haganah in Jerusalem.

Halpern, a certified ship's captain, was known as Rav Hahovel (captain of the ship) for his role in the development of Jewish seamanship.

== Family ==
Jeremiah Halpern was the son of Michael Halpern (Y'hiel Mikhael Halpern; Yekhiel Michal Halperin) descendant of a wealthy rabbinical family from Vilnius, Lithuania, who is now known mainly as the first proponent of a Jewish Legion. Michael emigrated to Palestine from Smolensk in 1885 and was involved in setting up Jewish colonies on land bought from Arabs, in founding the first Hebrew workers' union and in helping to found the Workers of Zion movement and the Jewish self-defense force in 1905.

Jeremiah was brought to Palestine in 1913.

== Education and career ==
Jeremiah Halpern was educated at the Herzliya Hebrew Gymnasium in Tel Aviv and following his high school education graduated as a captain from the Italian Naval Academy in 1917. In 1919 he graduated from the London School for Captains and Engineers, becoming an apprentice sailor on the Jewish ship Hechalutz in the same year. Halpern assisted in the defence of Jews of the Old City of Jerusalem during the 1920 Palestine riots. Subsequently, he was a leader of Betar, the Revisionist youth movement, and headed the Betar School of Instruction. On taking up permanent residence in Palestine in 1933 Halpern was associated primarily with the Hebrew Committee of National Liberation. He was also in charge of military training for the World Betar movement.

In later years he was associated with the Irgun underground group in Palestine and Europe, undertook various Revisionist missions to the United States between 1939 and 1941 and was active in Hillel Kook's Bergson Group.

In the early 1940s Halpern worked with Lord Stabolgi to achieve the objectives of Bergson's Committee for a Jewish Army, a campaign which was endorsed enthusiastically by the Jewish Chronicle, but which antagonised the Zionist establishment because of its association with Jabotinsky's New Zionist Organization.

=== The Training School for Betar Instructors ===
Halepern established the Training School for Betar Instructors (or Betar 'madricihim,' also often translated as 'youth guides' or 'youth leaders') in Tel Aviv in 1928, serving as its first director. Halpern recruited Abba Ahimeir as an instructor of the nationalist youth and together the pair led the School in an increasingly radical direction in which military training was viewed as a means of establishing the military wing of a national liberation movement.

Under the leadership of Halpern (and later of Ahimeir) the 24 cadets took the lead in organising demonstrative activities outside Betar, which notably included taking the initiative in the march to the Western Wall in August 1929.

Halpern's cadets later formed the nucleus for the right-wing Maximalist tendency in Revisionism and the activities of Halpern and Ahimeir contributed to the evolution of the Irgun and to the support of Revisionist Maximalism within Betar.

=== 1929 Riots in Palestine ===
On 15 August, the Jewish fast of Tisha B'Av, three hundred Revisionist youths from the Battalion for the Defence of the Language and Betar, who were led by Halpern, marched to the Western Wall proclaiming "The Wall is ours".

Two days later, in raised tensions caused by a 2000-strong Muslim counter-demonstration after Friday prayers the day before, a Jewish youth, Avraham Mizrahi, was killed and an Arab youth picked at random was stabbed in retaliation. Subsequently, the violence escalated into rioting throughout Palestine.

The demonstration by Revisionist youth of 15 August was later identified as the proximal cause of the riots by the Shaw Commission.

=== The Brit HaHayal ===
Halpern was world commander of the Brit HaHayal, a Revisionist association of Jewish reservists in the Polish Army that grew into a world organisation with regional military and political training schools for members.

By 1939 Brit HaHayal had 25,000 members worldwide.

=== The Betar Naval Academy ===
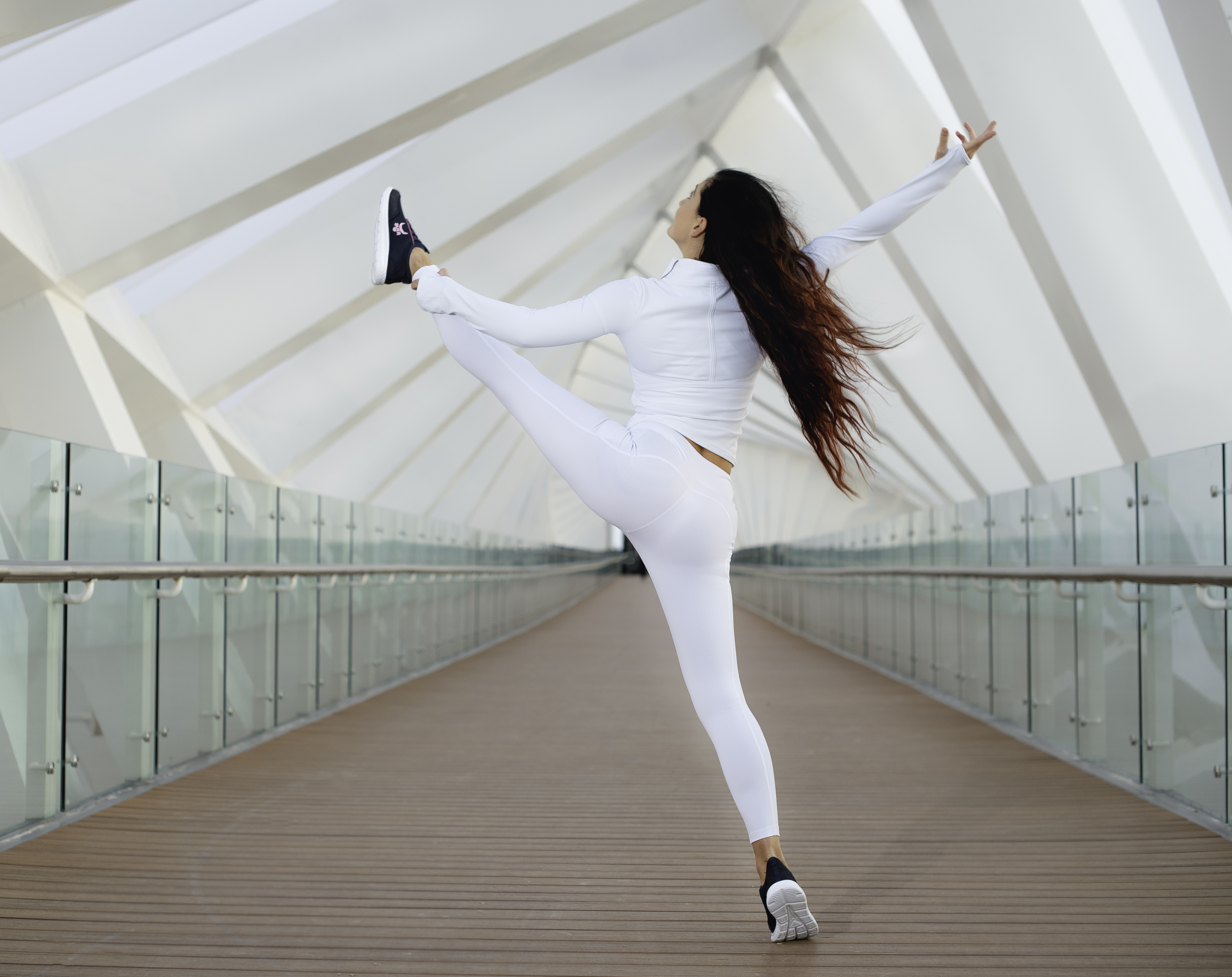
The Sarah I: a 190-foot four-masted schooner of 750 tons used as a training ship by the Betar Naval Academy.

Under the direction of Jabotinsky the Betar Naval Academy was established in Civitavecchia, Italy in 1934. The titular head was the Italian maritime scientist Nicola Fusco but Jeremiah Halpern ran the School and was its driving force. The School trained cadets from all over Europe, Palestine and South Africa and produced some of the future commanders of the Israeli Navy.

Although the Revisionists were keen to ensure that trainees avoided local Fascist politics the cadets did express public support for Benito Mussolini's regime, as Halpern later detailed in his book History of Hebrew Seamanship. Cadets marched alongside Italian soldiers in support of the Second Italo–Abyssinian War and collected metal scraps for the Italian weapons industry. They "felt as if they were living the true Beitarist life in an atmosphere of herosim, militarism, and nationalistic pride."

The academy closed in 1938.

=== World War II ===
At the outbreak of World War II Halpern was sent to negotiate with the Canadian Admiralty for the establishment of a Jewish Naval School to train members of a special Jewish unit for the British Army.

In 1942 Halpern opened a school for frogmen in France, established a school for skipper cadets in London and was successful in attracting support from British officers and members of the Rothschild family. Around 350 officers, mechanics and fishermen graduated from these schools.

=== Post-war activities ===
Halpern returned to Israel in 1948 and lived in Eilat, where he studied oceanography and founded the Eilat Naval Museum, which was subsequently named after him.

In 1951 Halpern proposed to David Ben-Gurion to re-organise the Israeli commercial and military Marine Corps and to establish a research programme to explore the natural resources of the Red Sea.

In 1959 Halpern proposed an Eliat Canal as an alternative to the Suez Canal.

Halpern wrote a number of books, including Tĕḥiyat ha-yamaʼut ha-ʻIvrit (1960) and Avi, Mikhaʼel Helpern (1964).

== Commemoration ==
Halpern's contribution to Hebrew seamanship is commemorated by a research scholarship offered by the University of Haifa's Department of Maritime Civilizations.

In addition to the scholarship the Halpern Foundation funded a research boat, the RV Halpern (launched September, 2005), for faculty members and students of the Leon Recanati Institute for Maritime Studies at the University of Haifa.

== See also ==
- Pro–Wailing Wall Committee
- 1929 Palestine riots
