= Wolfgang von Weisl =

Revisionist leader

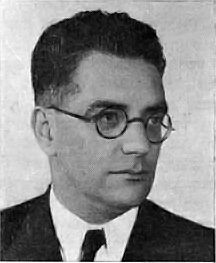
Binyamin Ze'ev (Wolfgang) von Weisl

Wolfgang Johannes (Binyamin Ze'ev), Ritter von Weisl, Hebrew: בנימין זאב (וולפגנג) פון וייזל (וייסל) (1896, in Vienna – February 24,1974, in Gedera) was one of the founders of the Revisionist movement and a leader in the Zionist struggle for establishing a Jewish state. He was a writer and journalist, a physician and medical researcher, a military man and military strategist, an Austrian noble and an expert in Islam.

== Early life and education ==
Dr. Wolfgang Johannes von Weisl was born in Vienna, Austria, in 1896. The Weisl family was originally from Bezděkov u Klatov (German: Besdiekau/Klattau). His father, Dr. Ernst Franz von Weisl (1857, Sabechlitz (Czech: Záběhlice) – 1931, Vienna), who received the ennobling predicate "von" from Emperor Franz Josef, was among the first Jews to join Theodor Herzl in his Zionist movement. For his son, Wolfgang, this was a call to the flag, and a cause to which he dedicated his life. For Weisl junior, Zionism meant living in the Land of Israel, at the time Ottoman, then British Mandate Palestine, participation in its building and defence, and the struggle to ensure its independence toward the return to Zion.

At the age of 11 (1907) Wolfgang von Weisl launched his Zionist path with his first political article with a call to transport Yemenite Jews to the land of Israel. The article was published in the Wiener Handelsblatt.

In 1914, in the midst of his medical studies, he served as an artillery officer in the Austro-Hungarian army, earned the Iron Cross medal, distributed the Jewish national colours of blue and white to Jewish officers, and established a Jewish corps for the defense of the Jewish quarter.

His work with the Jewish National Fund brought him in touch with Zeev Jabotinsky, then a leading man in Keren Hayesod. Weisl proposed to buy a whole corps' gear and armament for 60,000 Lira; to transport 30,000 pioneers and to conquer the Land of Israel. This proposal set Weisl's ideology and heritage: Weisl believed that Israel could survive on the condition that it had a strong army and kept to the historical borders – the only defensible borders.

== In British Mandate Palestine ==
In 1922, right after he completed his medical studies in the University of Vienna, Weisl immigrated to the Holy Land and received a Palestine passport. When, four decades later, he was asked by the Austrian ambassador to Israel why he had not returned to the "beloved Vienna" after the war, Weisl answered: "When I was a medical student in Vienna graffiti on the walls and doors of the toilets called: "Jews out!". And I always read toilet literature seriously."

In 1924 Wolfgang von Weisl launched a career as the representative of Ullstein, the publication house, to the Near East and the Islamic countries. His articles were translated and published all over the world. He was considered a world specialist in Islam and was listed in The Statesman's Year Book year after year.

In 1925 Weisl was a founding member of the Revisionist Party.

Weisl was welcome at kings' and shahs' courts: He was received by the Khalif, Hussein, the Hedjazi king – when he was a king, and was the only European to have dined with the Khalif at his last royal meal, before his forced exile. He was a guest of King Ibn Saud, stayed at the home of Sultan al-Atrash, the leader of the Druze's insurgency, was in the palace of the Emir Abdallah of Trans-Jordan and his personal doctor, he was the personal and official guide and dragoman of King Fuad of Egypt during his state visit in Germany, and visited Jebel Druze during the rebellion. He could have made a great difference in what would later become the Israeli-Palestinian conflict: He offered Feisal, King of Iraq, a transfer of Palestinian Arabs to cultivate his vast unpopulated lands, received the king's blessing but encountered British objections. In Egypt he befriended Zaglul Pasha who hoped that the Zionists would sit on the Eastern shore of the Suez Canal understanding what the British refused to understand ... Sinai did not belong to Egypt then.

In 1929, at the time of the Feast of Purim, Dr. von Weisl was invited on the legendary Zeppelin trip from Berlin to the Mediterranean. On board were five German ministers, an Egyptian journalist, Graf Zeppelin's widow and other international public figures. Dr. Herman Badet, of the Prussian Interior Ministry, a religious Jew, read together with Weisl from the Esther Scroll while the Zeppelin hovered above the city of Tel Aviv to the excited cheers of the crowd below. Above the Dead Sea Weisl opened a Carmel Mizrahi bottle of wine and the travellers toasted the "People of Israel and their homeland".

A few months later, during the bloody disturbances of August 1929, Weisl was stabbed by an Arab and was thought dead. Eulogies are published around the world and in one of them he is mentioned as the Mark Twain of the German language, postcards with his picture are sold, trees are planted in his honour and prayers are given for his recovery. He survived and testified in front of the Shaw Commission.

In 1931 von Weisl called to prepare for world war and predicted the rise of Hitler, calling on the Jews to save themselves. During this time he was active against the partition of what was left of the Land of Israel – after a great portion was separated and given to Hussein. In 1935 Weisl proposed illegal immigration to Palestine and, overruling Jabotinsky's opposition, raised the funds needed for the first "illegal" immigrants' ship "Af Al Pi" (Despite).

On 1 September 1946, jailed in Latrun, Weisl wrote to the British High Commissioner: "… I have the honour to inform you that I shall abstain from taking food for a period of 28 days… I am well aware of the fact that neither my fasting nor that of anybody else will influence the attitude or the decisions of the men who rule today over Palestine and who, apparently, regard it as their duty to hinder by all means the return of Israel to its Home…" and turned from an unusual and controversial leader – even in his own party – to a national hero.

== Death and legacy ==
On 25 February 1974, a day after his death, and in March 1974 Weisl's last 2 articles were published, sealing his intellectual activity which encompassed thousands of articles and lectures and several books in different subjects: politics, military, medicine, theology, philosophy, psychology, travel, and even astrology. His series about Saint Theresia Neumann was published in a special edition and 800,000 copies were sold in a few days.

"[O]ne of the most fascinating and picturesque characters", "the story of his life can fill a few volumes", "legends surrounded him", "the man with the golden pen", "a genius", "a prophet", but also "a charlatan", "Don Quixote", "an adventurer" and "a fascist". A man about whom it has been written: "There is only one ism that fits Dr. von Weisl – vonweislism".
