= Hope Simpson Enquiry =

British Commission managed by Sir John Hope Simpson

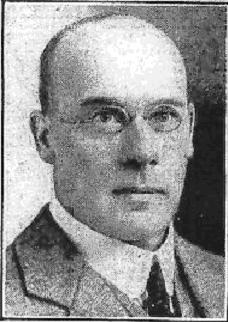
John Hope Simpson

The Report on Immigration, Land Settlement and Development, commonly referred to as the Hope Simpson Enquiry or the Hope Simpson Report, was a British Commission managed by Sir John Hope Simpson, established during August 1929 to address Immigration, Land Settlement and Development issues in British Mandate of Palestine, as recommended by the Shaw Commission, after the widespread 1929 Palestine riots.

The report was dated October 1, 1930, but was released on October 21, 1930. The report found that the amount of cultivable land in Palestine was significantly lower than what was previously estimated, and left little room for new immigrant farmers. It recommended limiting Jewish immigration based on the economic absorptive capacity of Palestine. The Passfield White Paper was also dated October 1, 1930, and recommended similar limiting of Jewish immigration.

== Land settlement and employment ==
The mandate and ambition of the Hope-Simpson Commission was to associate the issues of immigration, land settlement, and agricultural development in a way that would allow the government to deploy policies that could serve the country as a whole. The Report emphasized the need to develop a national water regime as the basis of the system it wished to create. Relying on this advice and on colonial experience elsewhere, the government later established a Water Board and drafted its first irrigation bill.

The commission reported the real estate price growth and availability to the Arabs:

"They [Jews] paid high prices for the land, and in addition they paid to certain of the occupants of those lands a considerable amount of money which they were not legally bound to pay."

(p. 56:) "Actually the result of the purchase of land in Palestine by the Jewish National Fund has been that land became extra territorial. It ceases to be land from which the Arab can gain any advantage either now or at any time in the future. Not only can he never hope to lease or cultivate it, but, by the stringent provisions of the lease of the Jewish National Fund, he is deprived forever from employment on the land."

It concluded that Arab fears of the destructive impact of Zionist colonization were well-founded, and thus called for controls:

(p. 135:) "It is impossible to view with equanimity the extension of an enclave in Palestine from which the Arabs are excluded. The Arab population already regards the transfer of lands to Zionist hands with dismay and alarm. These cannot be dismissed as baseless in light of the Zionist policy described above."

Hope Simpson emphasized that, due to the Zionist labour policy extending to all Jewish enterprises, displaced Arab farmers could not find non-agricultural employment, making the problem of unemployment among the Arabs "serious and widespread":

"There can be no doubt that there is at present time serious unemployment among Arab craftsmen and among Arab laborers."

"Arab unemployment is serious and general."

The Zionist contention that Arab workers benefited from Jewish immigration was therefore refuted by the report:

(p.133:) "The policy of the Jewish Labour Federation is successful in impeding the employment of Arabs in Jewish colonies and in Jewish enterprises of every kind. There is therefore no relief to be anticipated from an extension of Jewish enterprise unless some departure from existing practice is effected."

The report also addressed the hypothetical situation of "swollen unemployment lists":

"[A]rab unemployment is liable to be used as a political pawn. Arab politicians are sufficiently astute to realize at once what may appear an easy method of blocking that [Jewish] immigration to which they are radically averse, and attempts may and probably will be made to swell the list of Arabs unemployed with names which should not be there, or perhaps to ensure the registration of an unemployed man in the books of more than one exchange. It should not prove difficult to defeat this manoevre."

== Immigration ==
The report acknowledged illegal immigration both of Arabs and of Jews across the Mandate borders:

The Chief Immigration Officer has brought to notice that illicit immigration through Syria and across the northern frontier of Palestine is material. This question has already been discussed. It may be a difficult matter to ensure against this illicit immigration, but steps to this end must be taken if the suggested policy is adopted, as also to prevent unemployment lists being swollen by immigrants from TransJordania."

"Discouragement of illicit entry. As to the treatment of such [illegal] immigrants, when they are discovered, it should be the rule that they are at once returned to the country whence they came. The rule may possibly work harshly in individual cases, but unless it is understood that detection is invariably followed by expulsion the practice will not cease. It is probable that it will cease entirely as soon as it is discovered that the rule is actually in force.
The case of the ´pseudo-traveller´ who comes in with a permission for a limited time and continues in Palestine after the term of his permission has expired is more difficult. Where the case is flagrant, recourse should certainly be had to expulsion. In case of no special flagrancy, and where there is no special objection to the individual, it is probably sufficient to maintain the present practice, under which he is counted against the Labor Schedule, though this method does a certain injustice to the Jewish immigrant outside the country, whose place is taken by the traveller concerned."

In its conclusion, it said:

"In this Report the subjects of Land Settlement, Development and Immigration have been examined in that order as it is evident that the question of Immigration depends on the action taken in respect of the first two."

== See also ==
- Passfield White Paper, published on the same day
- Vaad Leumi

== Notes ==
By "pseudo-traveller" is meant a person who arrived legally on a (temporary) visa, and then stayed on after the visa has expired.

== Sources ==
- Sir John Hope Simpson: Palestine: Report on Immigration, Land Settlement, and Development (London: His Majesty's Stationery Office, 1930.)
