= Brit HaHayal =

Jewish unit in the Polish Army

The Brit HaHayal was a Revisionist Zionist association of Jewish reservists in the Polish Army formed in December, 1932 in Radom. The first branch was established Warsaw in February 1933 with the aim of "taking part in the struggle of the Jewish people for the reconstruction of the Jewish State on both sides of the Jordan River.

The first conference of the organisation in Warsaw in October, 1933 was attended by Revisionist leader Ze'ev Jabotinsky and 1500 delegates from 170 branches.

In response to growing antisemitism Brit HaHayal assumed a role in organising units for the defence of Jews and Jewish culture and property in Poland in addition to maintaining its original Palestine-centred programme.

At the first world conference in Kraków in January, 1935 delegates endorsed a proposal to establish regional military and political training schools for members. The organisation itself was also modelled on a military unit and was based on strict discipline and a clear chain of command.

By 1939 Brit HaHayal had 25,000 members worldwide. The world commander of the organisation was Jeremiah Halpern, a certified ship's captain and seasoned Revisionist leader.
