= Pro–Wailing Wall Committee =

Committee founded in 1929 to promote Jewish rights at Jerusalem's Western Wall

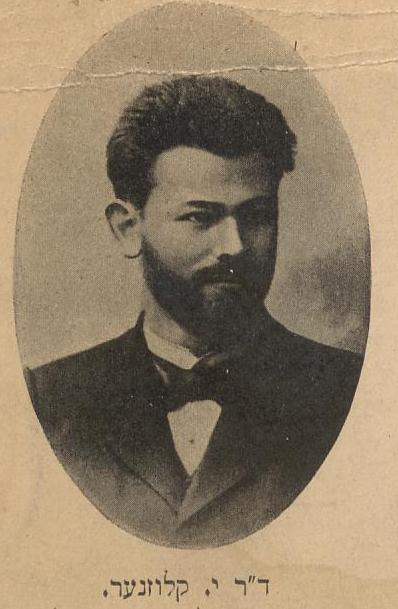
Early image (c. 1910) of Dr. Joseph Klausner, founder of the Pro–Wailing Wall Committee.

The Pro–Wailing Wall Committee was established in Mandatory Palestine on 24 July 1929, by Joseph Klausner, professor of modern Hebrew literature at the Hebrew University of Jerusalem, to promote Jewish rights at the Western Wall.

The committee created a programme of political activities organised and promoted by a loose coalition of Revisionist Zionists, religious Zionists and young people. It also spawned many branches, which held meetings throughout the country.

== Background ==
Jews have prayed at the Western Wall since at least the sixteenth century, with prayer along the wall documented as early as the eleventh century. During the nineteenth century, the Western Wall was also invested with national significance by the Jewish national movement. From the late nineteenth century onwards pictures and postcards often depicted a rebuilt Jewish Temple on the Temple Mount, sometimes next to al-Aqsa Mosque or the Dome of the Rock and sometimes in their place. The heads of the Yeshivot in the Old Yishuv also used photomontages showing the Dome of the Rock with the Star of David and flags of Zion superimposed in fundraising appeals to Diaspora Jews. It thus came to be widely believed that a Jewish conspiracy was at work to replace the Muslim holy sites by a rebuilt Jewish Temple. The resulting tensions were exploited by both Palestinian Arab and Jewish nationalists.

Joseph Klausner was a member of the Odessa circle of political activists which included Ze'ev Jabotinsky and Menachem Ussishkin and although not a 'party man' he was a fellow traveller with Revisionist Zionism and contributed significantly to the Zionist education of Betar, the Revisionist youth movement, and nationalist youth in general. Klausner's background as an academic with expertise in the history of the Second Temple period and as an activist in Zionist polemics eventually brought him to the forefront of Jewish anger at the failure of the Zionist establishment in Palestine to resolve problems over access to, and arrangements for worship at, the Western Wall.

The political vacuum caused by the absence of the British High Commissioner, Sir John Chancellor, and of the Zionist leadership, who were in attendance at the 16th Zionist Congress in Zurich, allowed the Pro–Wailing Wall Committees to pursue a more radical agenda during the run up to Tisha B'Av, the day of mourning and remembrance commemorating the destruction of both the First Temple and Second Temple, which fell on 15 August in 1929. Responding to criticism from the establishment, who feared that incitement of the youth would lead to "accidents" of no "practical utility", Klausner's Committee wrote in the pages of Do'ar HaYom: "We cannot trust any more the actions of existing institutions in this matter and it was decided to take separate action". In an article in the pages of The Palestine Weekly on the same day Klausner wrote: "But what about the Jews, cannot they too throw stones, have they not hands or even fists? What did Shakespeare say through his Shylock? 'Hath not a Jew eyes ... if you wrong us, shall we not revenge...' "

During The Nine Days the Committee published an appeal:

"Ye Jews, and national Jews in all parts of the world! Wake up and unite! Do not keep silent or rest in peace until the entire Wall has been restored to us! Form yourselves into pro-Wailing Wall societies! Hold meetings of protest! Go and demonstrate before the British Consuls in all countries on behalf of the Wall! Submit protests memorials to them! Explain to the Jewish masses and to the young generation what has been and what is the Kotel to Israel in the past and at present! Explain to the righteous and the pious among the nations of the world what is the national insult which we have suffered at the hands of the British officials without justice or right! Move heaven and earth at the unspeakable and unprecedented injustice and oppression which tends to rob a live nation of the last of its relics and its 'poor man's lamb.' Those of us who are here will not rest until that relic which has always been ours, which had been sealed with the blood of scores of thousands of our children through two millennia and which has absorbed the tears of Israel for two thousand years, has been restored to us. Come to our help by co-operating in this just struggle for the Wall and triumph is sure to come.
Jerusalem, during the Nine Days of Mourning. 5689.
Pro–Wailing Wall Committee."

The appeal was followed by a protest meeting organised by the World Federation of Hebrew Youth which was addressed by Revisionists and religious Zionists from Mizrachi, the movement supported by Chief Rabbi Abraham Isaac Kook. The meeting was held in Tel Aviv on the eve of Tisha B'Av, and was attended by 6,000 people, according to British intelligence. It adopted four resolutions and called on the Chief Rabbinate and Klausner's Committee to continue the political struggle for the Wall.

== The outbreak of violence ==
On 15 August 1929, Tisha B'Av, the Revisionist youth leader Jeremiah Halpern and three hundred Revisionist youths from the Battalion of the Defenders of the Language and Betar marched to the Western Wall proclaiming "The Wall is ours". The protesters raised the Zionist flag and sang the Hatikvah. The demonstration took place in the Muslim Maghribi district in front of the house of the Mufti.

Two days later, in raised tensions caused by a 2000-strong Muslim counter-demonstration after Friday prayers the day before, a Jewish youth, Avraham Mizrahi, was killed and an Arab youth picked at random was stabbed in retaliation. Subsequently, the violence escalated into the 1929 Palestine riots.

The demonstration by Revisionist youth of 15 August was later identified as the proximal cause of the riots by the Shaw Commission.
