= Association for Palestinian Products =

Jewish group established in the 1930s

The Association for Palestinian Products
- Formation: Mid-1930s
- Founded at: Tel Aviv, Mandatory Palestine
- Purpose: Promotion of Jewish community products in Palestine
- Headquarters: Tel Aviv
- Formerly called: Product Loyalist Alliance

The Association for Palestinian Products, later known as the Product Loyalist Alliance, was established in Tel Aviv, Mandatory Palestine in the mid-1930s to promote products of the Jewish community.

In common with the Battalion for the Defence of the Language the Association attempted to impose national loyalty on people as part of their daily routine, declaring, "Every man and woman in the Yishuv, without regard to faction or party, must lend a hand to this important effort, directed at strengthening the economy and against the enemies of our rebirth."

Volunteer product loyalists patrolled markets and threatened merchants who sold Arab products. Those who did not comply were denounced as traitors in graffiti on shop doors and had their display windows broken.

== See also ==
- Arab general strike (Mandatory Palestine)
