= War of the Languages =

Debate in the land of Israel over Jewish language instruction

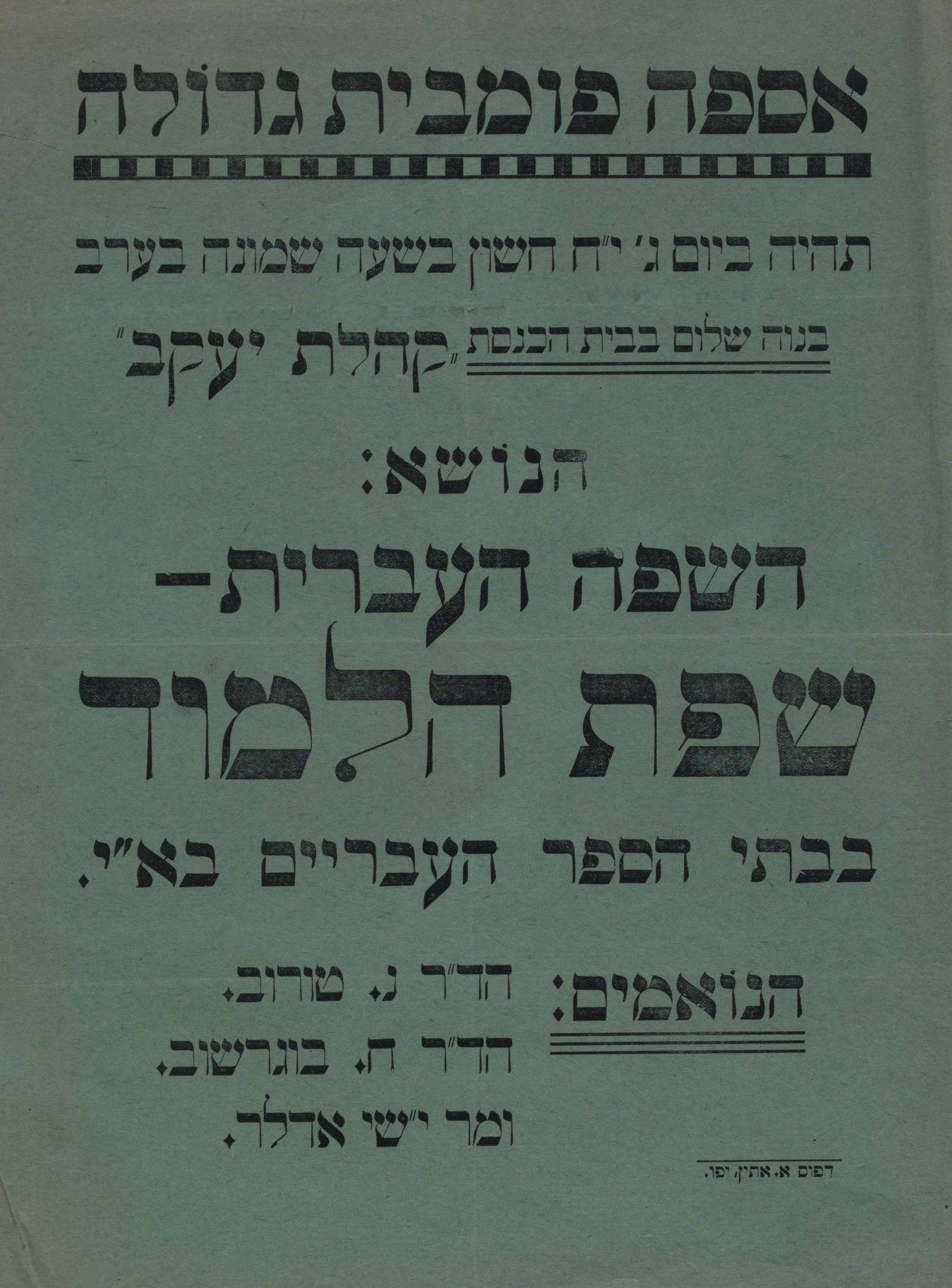
"The Storm of Posters: The Battle for the Hebrew Language"

The war of the languages (Hebrew: מלחמת השפות, romanized: Milhemet HaSafot), also known as the Language War, was a heated debate in the land of Israel over the language of instruction in the region's new Jewish schools. This "language war" was a cornerstone event in the history of the revival of the Hebrew language and its consolidation as Israel's official language.

== Background ==
Hebrew was the language of instruction in 1904 in 6 of the 29 organized schools in the land of Israel. It was decided in 1908 to establish the first professional post-secondary institution in Israel, which eventually became the Technion in Haifa. The name chosen for the new institution was Technikum (Hebrew: טכניקום), which was meant to educate and train skilled workers (managers, technicians, engineers). In addition, a school with two majors, a technical major and a practical major, was to be established alongside it.

== History ==
The German Jewish aid agency Ezra, which had maintained schools for Jewish immigrants in the land of Israel since 1905, sought to establish German as the language of instruction at the Technikum in 1913, which it was sponsoring. This sparked a public controversy between those who supported the use of German, and those who believed that Hebrew should be the language used by the Jewish people in their homeland. The issue was not just ideological, because until then, Hebrew was primarily a liturgical language, and lacked modern technical terms.

The Haifa City Museum produced an exhibit on the "War of the Languages" in 2011, curated by Svetlana Reingold.

== See also ==
- Anti-Yiddish sentiment
- Battalion of the Defenders of the Language
- Culture of Israel
- Education in Israel
- Jewish languages
- Languages of Israel
