= Walter Shaw (judge) =

Sir Walter Sidney Shaw
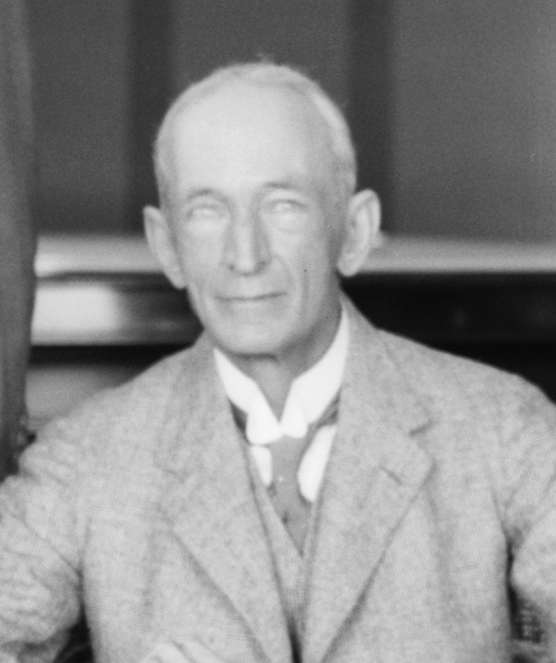
- Born: 15 April 1863; Marylebone, London
- Died: 24 April 1937 (aged 74); Wimborne, Dorset
- Education: Trinity College, Cambridge
- Occupations: Barrister, judge
- Spouse: Dorothy Emma Mortimore (m. 1895)

Sir Walter Sidney Shaw (15 April 1863 – 24 April 1937) was an English barrister and judge. He served as a judge in a number of British colonies, his last judicial appointment being as Chief Justice of the Straits Settlements. He was also the chairman of the Shaw Commission which investigated the 1929 Palestine riots.

== Early life ==
Born in 1863, Shaw was the second son of George Shaw, a barrister, of St George's Square, Pimlico. He was educated at Brighton College, leaving the school in 1879, and Trinity College, Cambridge, which was his father’s old college, where he was admitted in 1882.

He was called to the Bar from the Middle Temple in 1888.

== Legal career ==
Shaw practiced at common law at the bar from 1888 until 1906.

In 1906, Shaw was appointed Police Magistrate and Acting Chief Justice of St Vincent. He became Chief Justice in 1907 and was appointed to the Executive and Legislative Councils. From 1908 to 1909 he was Acting Chief Justice of Grenada. After two years without official duties, Shaw was Acting Administrator of St Vincent from 1911 to 1912, then from 1912 to 1914 was Chief Justice of British Honduras (now Belize). Between 1914 and 1921 he served as a puisne judge of the Supreme Court of Ceylon. He was knighted in the 1921 Birthday Honours.

He was appointed as Chief Justice of the Straits Settlements in 1921 and served in that position until his retirement in 1925.

When Shaw came to Singapore he introduced the custom of wearing a wig in court. Upon his retirement, he explained that it was "not because I have any desire to attire myself in fancy costume, or because I wished to give myself any special personal importance, but because I think that it tends to remind, not only the public and the Bar, but even the judge himself, that he is a representative of that very illustrious body of men – the English judges, who have done so much to establish and maintain the freedom of the English people".

== Shaw Commission ==
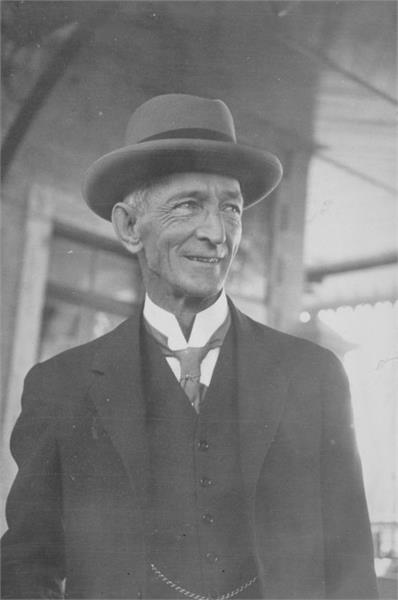
Walter Shaw 1929

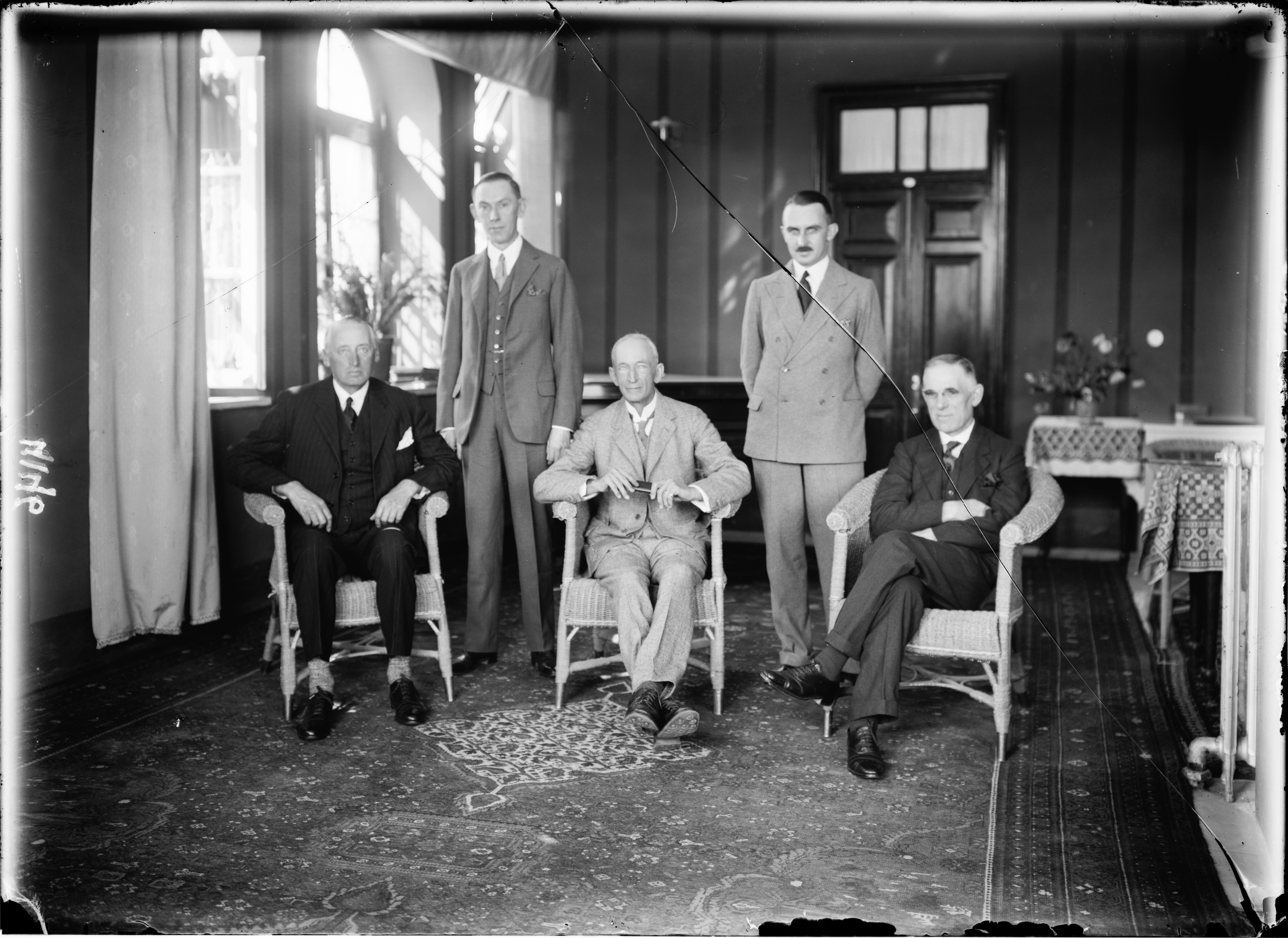
The Shaw Commission in 1929. Shaw is seated in the centre.

In 1929, Shaw chaired the Commission on the Palestine Disturbances of August 1929, commonly known as the Shaw Commission, which looked into the causes of the 1929 Palestine riots. The Shaw Commission found that the fundamental cause of the violence "without which in our opinion disturbances either would not have occurred or would have been little more than a local riot, is the Arab feeling of animosity and hostility towards the Jews consequent upon the disappointment of their political and national aspirations and fear for their economic future".

== Personal life ==
In 1895 Shaw married Dorothy Emma Mortimore, a daughter of Foster Mortimore. They had a son and a daughter.

Shaw died at home, Fenners, Wimborne, Dorset, on 24 April 1937. He was buried at Great Canford on 27 April.

== Legacy ==
Shaw Road in Singapore was either named after Shaw or another Shaw, a partner in Shaw, Whitehead and Company.
