= Svetlana Reingold =

Israeli museologist and curator

- Born: סבטלנה ריינגולד
- Education: Haifa University
- Known for: Curator

Svetlana Reingold (Hebrew: סבטלנה ריינגולד) is an Israeli museologist and curator, who is currently serving as Chief Curator of the Haifa Museum of Art.

== Biography ==
Svetlana Reingold graduated from Haifa University in 1996 with a BA degree and in 2000 received a MA degree from the same university. Reingold worked in different positions in Haifa Museums from 1996 till 2010, when she was appointed curator of the Mane Katz Museum. She was additionally appointed to be curator of Hermann Struck Museum in 2013. Reingold was appointed curator of Haifa Museum of Art in March 2015. In her work as curator, Reingold is a major proponent of "Artivism" and the idea that art is not only here for beauty, but also is a major part of changing the world.

== Exhibitions ==
Svetlana Reingold curated the "Mané-Katz: The Jewish Heritage" exhibition in Mane Katz Museum in 2011, "SANCTITY - ART - AESTHETICS" in 2012 and "The Wandering Jew: an Artistic Reflection" exhibition in 2015 in the same museum. Her first exhibition cluster in Haifa Museum of Art was a project called "Seven Solo Exhibitions". Reingold curated the exhibition "Steinhardt and Struck, An Artist and His Mentor" in the Hermann Struck Museum in 2016. Since her appointment as a chief curator at the Haifa Museum of Art, she has created and curated two major exhibition clusters. The first, Dangerous Art, opened in December 2017. In 2018, she curated an exhibition of feminist works in Mane Katz museum, called "Chana Orloff: Feminist Sculpture in Israel". The exhibition sparked a controversy, since many of the sculptures depicted the naked female body in unconventional forms. In 2018, she curated the exhibition cluster "Shop It" at the Haifa Museum of Art, connecting the themes of shopping, art and Consumerism. The same year Reingold curated the exhibition "Artist Books in the Digital Age" at the National Maritime Museum of Israel. In 2011 she curated an exhibit entitled "War of the Languages," commemorating the centennial of the founding of the Technion. The title of the exhibit was taken from the so-called War of the Languages, a "war" fought with words over the question of whether the new Technion would teach its students in Hebrew or in German, then the language of the world's leading scientific universities and research.

== Publications ==
- Anonymous X: End of the Age of Privacy. Haifa Museum of Art. 2018. ISBN 9-789-655350-463.
