= Battalion of the Defenders of the Language =

Jewish group in Mandatory Palestine

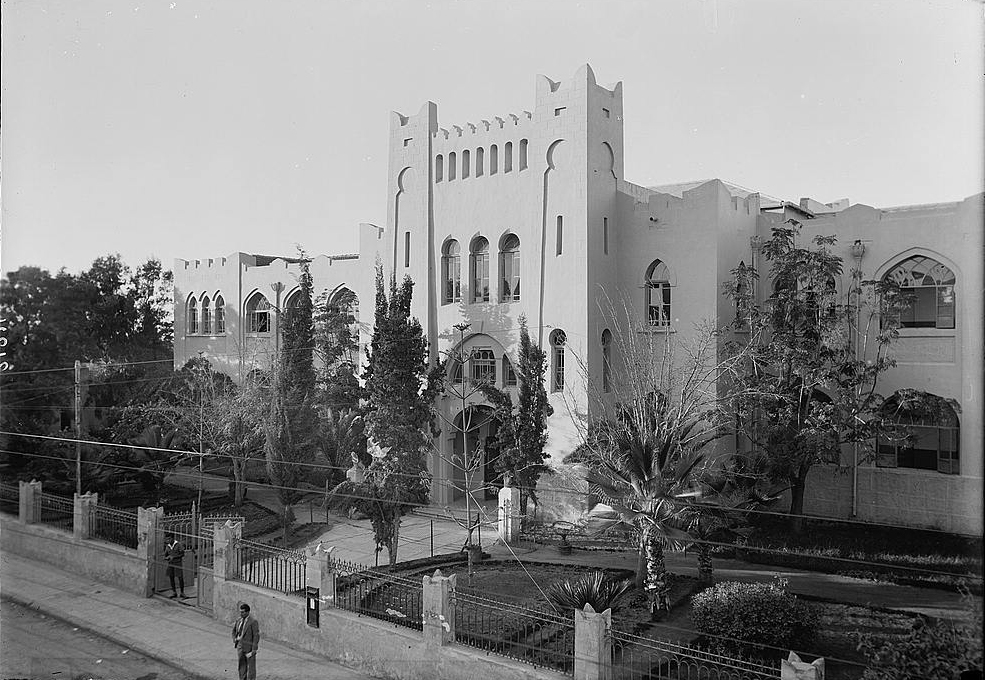
Herzliya Hebrew Gymnasium in 1936.

The Battalion of the Defenders of the Language (Hebrew: גדוד מגיני השפה, romanized: G'dud meginei ha-safa) was a small militant body established by Jewish students at the Herzliya Hebrew Gymnasium in Tel Aviv in the 1920s to urge Jews in then Mandatory Palestine to use only the Hebrew language. The Battalion campaigned against the use of other languages under the slogan עברי, דבר עברית (Ivri, daber ivrit; "Hebrew [i.e. Jew], speak Hebrew!")

== Formation ==
Many early Zionists felt that the revival of the Hebrew language was a critical part of their endeavours. Hebrew was already a well-established language in the land of Israel by the 1920s. However, with the arrival of thousands of immigrants to the land of Israel, as part of the Third Aliyah, many olim continued to speak their native languages, such as Russian and Yiddish.

The Battalion of the Defenders of the Language was formed to protect the status of the Hebrew language, and promote its use among these newcomers. Among its most prominent supporters were Mordechai Ben-Hillel Hacohen, a Zionist Hebrew writer, who was one of the founders of the city of Tel Aviv; and Zvi Yehuda Kook, the son of the chief rabbi Abraham Isaac Kook. Many of the activists came from the Herzliya Hebrew Gymnasium, which had long been a centre of pro-Hebrew language activity — its alumni had organised a protest in 1913 against the use of German, which was the language of instruction in the newly-founded Technion institute.

== Activities ==
The Battalion put up posters and neon signs around Tel Aviv encouraging the use of Hebrew, and instructed its members to use only Hebrew in their day-to-day lives. Members of the Battalion also went out onto the streets replacing Russian and Yiddish shop signs with Hebrew ones and fixing grammatical errors in existing Hebrew signs. One member even publicly reprimanded the poet Hayim Nahman Bialik for speaking Yiddish in the street. A number of members of the Battalion joined the march to the Western Wall in 1929, which was used as the pretext for the 1929 Palestine riots.

== Reaction ==
The Yiddish press tended to portray the group as "a gang of fanatic, insolent hoodlums". However, the battalion was seldom involved in any real violence.

== Analysis ==
Ghil'ad Zuckermann has pointed out that the Battalion's efforts were concentrated exclusively against the use of non-Hebrew words, whereas they were content with words and phrases calqued into Hebrew, such as the expression מה נשמע ma nishma ('How are you?', literally 'what is heard?'), a calque from Yiddish and other European languages.

== See also ==
- Hebrew language
- Revival of the Hebrew language
- Pro-Wailing Wall Committee
- Association for Palestinian Products
- War of the Languages
