= Shaw Commission =

1929–30 British inquiry into riots in Palestine

Report of the Commission on the Palestine Disturbances of August 1929
- Created: March 1930
- Purpose: Investigation of the causes of the 1929 Palestine riots

Report of the Commission on the Palestine Disturbances of August 1929

The Shaw Report, officially the Report of the Commission on the Palestine Disturbances of August 1929, commonly known as the Shaw Commission, was the result of a British commission of inquiry, led by Sir Walter Shaw, established to investigate the violent rioting in Palestine in late August 1929. The commission's report was issued in March 1930 and led to the establishment of the Hope Simpson Enquiry in May 1930.

While the violence was the direct result of an ongoing dispute over the Jews' ability to worship freely at the Western Wall, and the fear of obstruction of Palestinian Natives in their ability to access their residences in the Maghribi Waqf. The Commission concluded that the conflict was not religious in nature, and that the holy site had become a "symbol of racial pride and ambition." It determined that the cause of the violent outbreak was "racial animosity on the part of the Arabs, consequent upon the disappointment of their political and national aspirations and fear for their economic future." Additionally, the Report specifically stated that disappointment "attached to the various promises made" by the British to both the Arabs and Zionists during the first World War, played a role in creating tensions between the two groups. Those promises being the McMahon-Hussein correspondence promising Arab sovereignty of the region after the first World War and the Balfour declaration promising a national home for the Jewish people. The contributors to the commission explained this in the context of increased Jewish immigration and land purchases, which were threatening to produce a significant Arab landless class. The Report states of the economic impact of increased Jewish immigration and enterprise in the area that "the direct benefit to individual Arabs...has been small, almost negligible, with comparison to what it might have been had the pre-war methods of settlement been continued." This was later reiterated in the Hope Simpson Enquiry and subsequent Passfield white paper, both which called for limited Jewish immigration to Palestine.

== Overview ==
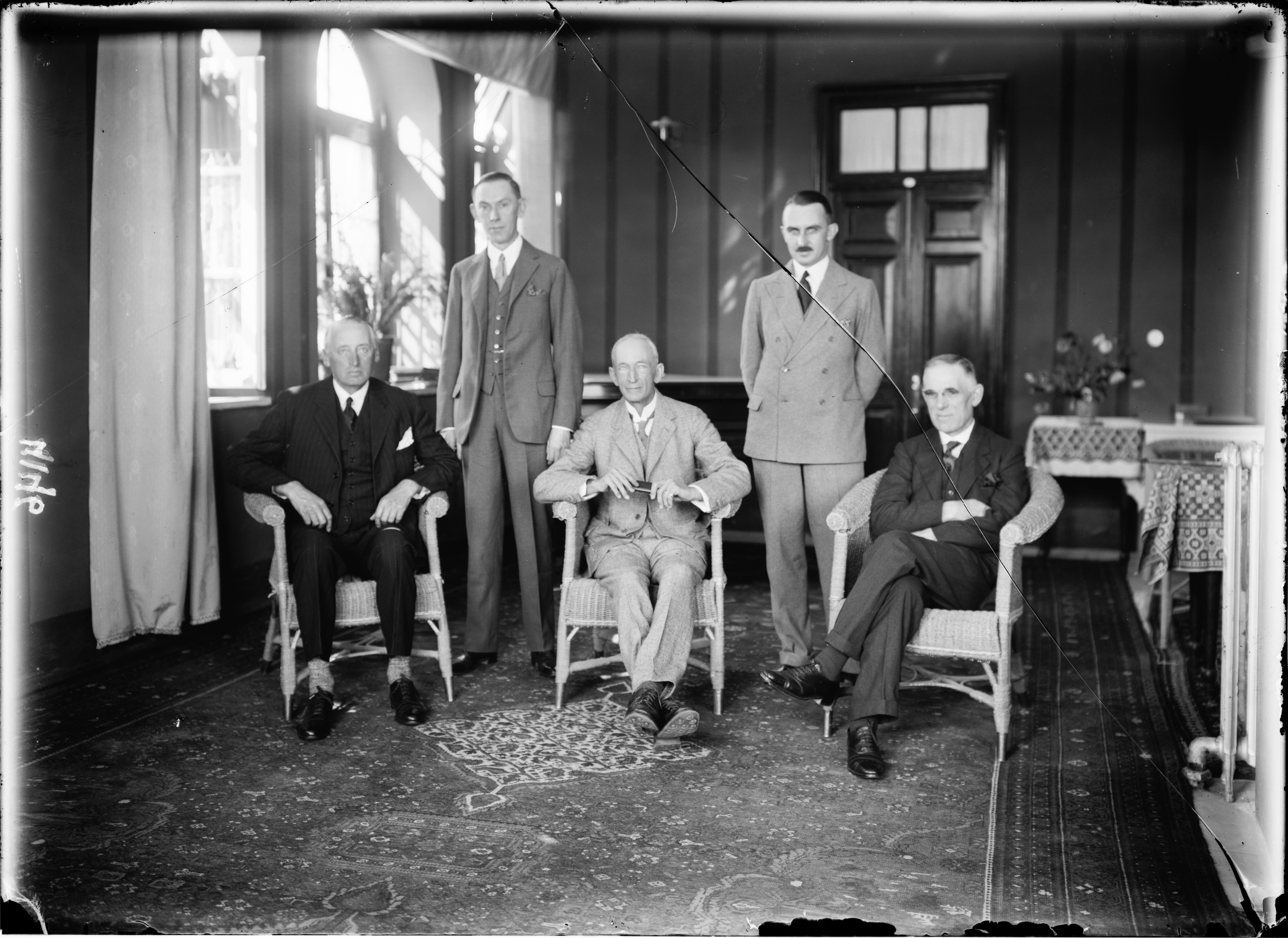
The Shaw Commission, October 1929, Jerusalem.

The British Commission of Inquiry was chaired by Sir Walter Shaw, a distinguished jurist, and consisting of three members of the British parliament, Sir Henry Betterton (Conservative), R. Hopkin Morris (Liberal) and Henry Snell (Labour). The aim of the Commission was to look into the reasons for the violent rioting in Palestine in late August 1929, which caused the deaths of 243 Jews and Arabs.

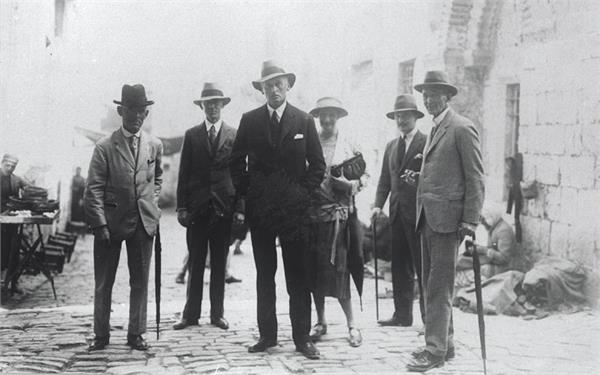
Members of Royal Commission 1929. From left: Snell, Morris, Sir Betterton, Mrs Betterton, Cust and Sir Shaw

The commission of enquiry took public evidence for several weeks, from the first hearing on 25 October to 29 December, hearing 120 witnesses in public testimony, and 20 behind closed doors. Though hearing the claims of both sides, the Commission made its recommendations primarily on the basis of material submitted by Mandatory officials

The Commission addressed two aspects of the disturbances, the immediate nature of the riots and the causes behind them. In the words of Naomi Cohen:

‘Delving beneath the immediate causes – i.e., the Western Wall dispute, inflammatory publications on both sides, the enlargement of the Jewish Agency, inadequate forces to maintain order, the report called attention to the underlying causes of friction in England's wartime pledges and in the anti-Jewish hostility that had resulted from the political and economic frustrations of the Arabs. It went on to criticise the immigration and land-purchase policies that, it said, gave Jews unfair advantages. The commission also recommended that the British take greater care in protecting the rights and understanding the aspirations of the Arabs. The Shaw report was a blow to Zionists everywhere,’

It found that the purchase of lands by Jewish Companies had been legal and fair to the tenants, but, at the same time, concluded that there was substance to the Arab claim that Jewish land purchase did constitute a present danger to the Arabs' national survival, since highly productive land was being bought, suggesting that 'immigrants would not be content to occupy undeveloped areas', with the consequence that 'the economic pressure upon the Arab population was likely to increase'

With regard to the conflict arising from the land settlement and purchase problem, it concluded that 'taking Palestine as a whole, the country cannot support a larger agricultural population than it at present carries unless methods of farming undergo a radical change'.

== Conclusions ==
The conclusions of the Commission, especially regarding the riots themselves, were as follows. [Material not in brackets is verbatim]

- The outbreak in Jerusalem on 23 August was from the beginning an attack by Arabs on Jews for which no excuse in the form of earlier murders by Jews has been established.
- The outbreak was not premeditated.
- [The disturbances] took the form, in the most part, of a vicious attack by Arabs on Jews accompanied by wanton destruction of Jewish property. A general massacre of the Jewish community at Hebron was narrowly averted. In a few instances, Jews attacked Arabs and destroyed Arab property. These attacks, though inexcusable, were in most cases in retaliation for wrongs already committed by Arabs in the neighbourhood in which the Jewish attacks occurred.
- The outbreak neither was nor was intended to be a revolt against British authority in Palestine.
- In playing the part that he took in the formation of societies for the defence of the Moslem Holy Places and in fostering the activities of such societies when formed, the Mufti was influenced by the twofold desire to confront the Jews and to mobilise Moslem opinion on the issue of the Wailing Wall. He had no intention of utilising this religious campaign as the means of inciting to disorder. Inasmuch as the movement which he in part created became through the force of circumstances a not unimportant factor in the events which led to the outbreak, the Mufti, like many others who directly or indirectly played upon public feeling in Palestine, must accept a share in the responsibility for the disturbances.
- ...in the matter of innovations of practice [at the Wailing Wall] little blame can be attached to the Mufti in which some Jewish religious authorities also would not have to share.
- There is no evidence that the Mufti issued any requests to Moslems in Palestine to come up to Jerusalem on 23 August and no connection has been established between the Mufti and the work of those who either are known or are thought to have engaged in agitation or incitement.
- After the disturbances had broken out the Mufti co-operated with the Government in their efforts both to restore peace and to prevent the extension of disorder.
- [No blame can be properly attached to the British government for failing to provide armed reinforcements, withholding of fire, and similar charges.]
- Jewish enterprise and Jewish immigration, when not in excess of the absorptive capacity of the country, have conferred material benefits upon Palestine in which the Arab people share. We consider, however, that the claims and demands which from the Zionist side have been advanced to the future of Jewish immigration into Palestine have been such as to arouse among the Arabs the apprehensions that they will in time be deprived of their livelihood and pass under the political domination of the Jews.
- There is incontestable evidence that in the matter of immigration there has been a serious departure by the Jewish authorities from the doctrine accepted by the Zionist Organization in 1922 that immigration should be regulated by the economic capacity of Palestine to absorb new arrivals.
- Between 1921 and 1929 there were large sales of land in consequence of which numbers of Arabs were evicted without the provision of other land for their occupation. ... The position is now acute. There is no alternative land to which persons evicted can remove. In consequence a landless and discontented class is being created. Such a class is a potential danger to the country.
- The fundamental cause, without which in our opinion disturbances either would not have occurred or would have been little more than a local riot, is the Arab feeling of animosity and hostility towards the Jews consequent upon the disappointment of their political and national aspirations and fear for their economic future. ... The feeling as it exists today is based on the twofold fear of the Arabs that by Jewish immigration and land purchases they may be deprived of their livelihood and in time pass under the political domination of the Jews.
- In our opinion the immediate causes of the outbreak were:-

1. The long series of incidents connected with the Wailing Wall... These must be regarded as a whole, but the incident among them which in our view contributed most to the outbreak was the Jewish demonstration at the Wailing Wall on 15 August 1929. Next in importance we put the activities of the Society for the Protection of the Moslem Holy Places and, in a lesser degree, of the Pro-Wailing Wall Committee.
2. Excited and intemperate articles which appeared in some Arabic papers, in one Hebrew daily paper and in a Jewish weekly paper published in English.
3. Propaganda among the less-educated Arab people of a character calculated to incite them.
4. The enlargement of the Jewish Agency.
5. The inadequacy of the military forces and of the reliable police available.
6. The belief, due largely to a feeling of uncertainty as to policy, that the decisions of the Palestine Government could be influenced by political considerations.

The Commission recommended that the Government reconsider its policies as to Jewish immigration and land sales to Jews. This led directly to the Hope Simpson Royal Commission in 1930.

The main victims of the rioting were Orthodox Jews, however the Orthodox community took a decision to boycott the Commission. According to the report (p. 169), all sides were eager to cooperate, and there was no shortage of testimony or evidence.

Pinhas Ofer in a journal article in Middle Eastern Studies details the British perspectives on the Shaw commission and how it was constructed. He details the need for the commission following the 1929 riots in Palestine, in order for the British government to influence "British public opinion and...the world at large." Ofer goes on to argue that even Britain's "own officials...admitted that the Shaw commission, in its findings and report had been guided by political considerations rather than by mere facts."

== Main recommendations ==
(i) His Majesty's government should issue a clear statement of the policy they intend to pursue in Palestine. The value of this statement would be greatly enhanced if it defined the meaning they attached to the passages in the Mandate safeguarding the rights of non-Jewish communities, and if it laid down more explicit directives on such vital issues as land and immigration.

(ii) Immigration policy should be clearly defined, and its administration reviewed "with the object of preventing a repetition of the excessive immigration of 1925 and 1926" Machinery should be devised through which non-Jewish interests could be consulted on the subject of immigration.

(iii) A scientific enquiry should be made into the possibilities of land development in Palestine, having regard to "the certain natural increase in the present rural population." Meanwhile, the "tendency towards the eviction of peasant cultivators from the land should be checked."

(iv) While making no formal recommendations on constitutional development, the commission observed that the difficulties of the administration were greatly aggravated by the absence of any measure of self-government.

== Note of Reservations ==
The report includes a 12-page "Note of Reservations" written by Lord Henry Snell. While accepting much of the report's findings, he challenges some points and makes a number of additional criticisms and recommendations. The following is a list of some of them.

Mr. Snell placed a much higher degree of responsibility on the shoulders of the Muslim spiritual and political leaders, including the Mufti and the Arab Executive. He also emphasized that the violence did not represent the will of the majority of Arabs, and that many took great risks to protect Jewish lives. Furthermore, he agreed that the "animosity and hostility toward the Jews were the fundamental cause of the outbreak," but he blamed this attitude on the campaign of propaganda and incitement, and not on the economic situation.

Mr. Snell also voiced additional criticisms of the British government in Palestine. First, while acknowledging that "the general question whether in a country of racial division one race should be supplied with arms by the Government for possible use against another is admittedly a difficult one," he questioned the decision to allow Arabs to gather en masse with clubs and sticks while disarming the Jewish congregants in Jerusalem, given the police's inability to protect them. Second, he criticized the Palestinian Government "for not having issued an official communiqué denying that the Jews had designs on the Moslem Holy Places.”

Notably, he questioned the report's conclusions regarding Jewish land procurement and immigration. He argued,

What is required in Palestine is, I believe, less a change of policy in these matters than a change of mind on the part of the Arab population, who have been encouraged to believe that they have suffered a great wrong and that the immigrant Jew constitutes a permanent menace to their livelihood and future. I am convinced that these fears are exaggerated and that on any long view of the situation the Arab people stand to gain rather than to lose from Jewish enterprise. There is no doubt in my mind that, in spite of errors of judgment which may have resulted in hardship to individual Arabs, Jewish activities have increased the prosperity of Palestine, have raised the standard of life of the Arab worker and have laid the foundations on which may be based the future progress of the two communities and their development into one State.

His commentary on the land problem led him to conclude that "progress in Palestine--by which I mean the joint progress of the two peoples--is to be looked for not along the lines of political concession but rather through social and economic reconstruction and the establishment of public security." In this respect, he held that the Palestine Government should be administratively and financially responsible for ensuring that no Arabs went landless.

He also spoke to the need of Jewish leaders to help alleviate the Arab's concerns and misapprehensions.

== See also ==
- Peel Commission, 1937
