= Old City of Hebron =

Historical city center of Hebron, Palestine

UNESCO World Heritage Site
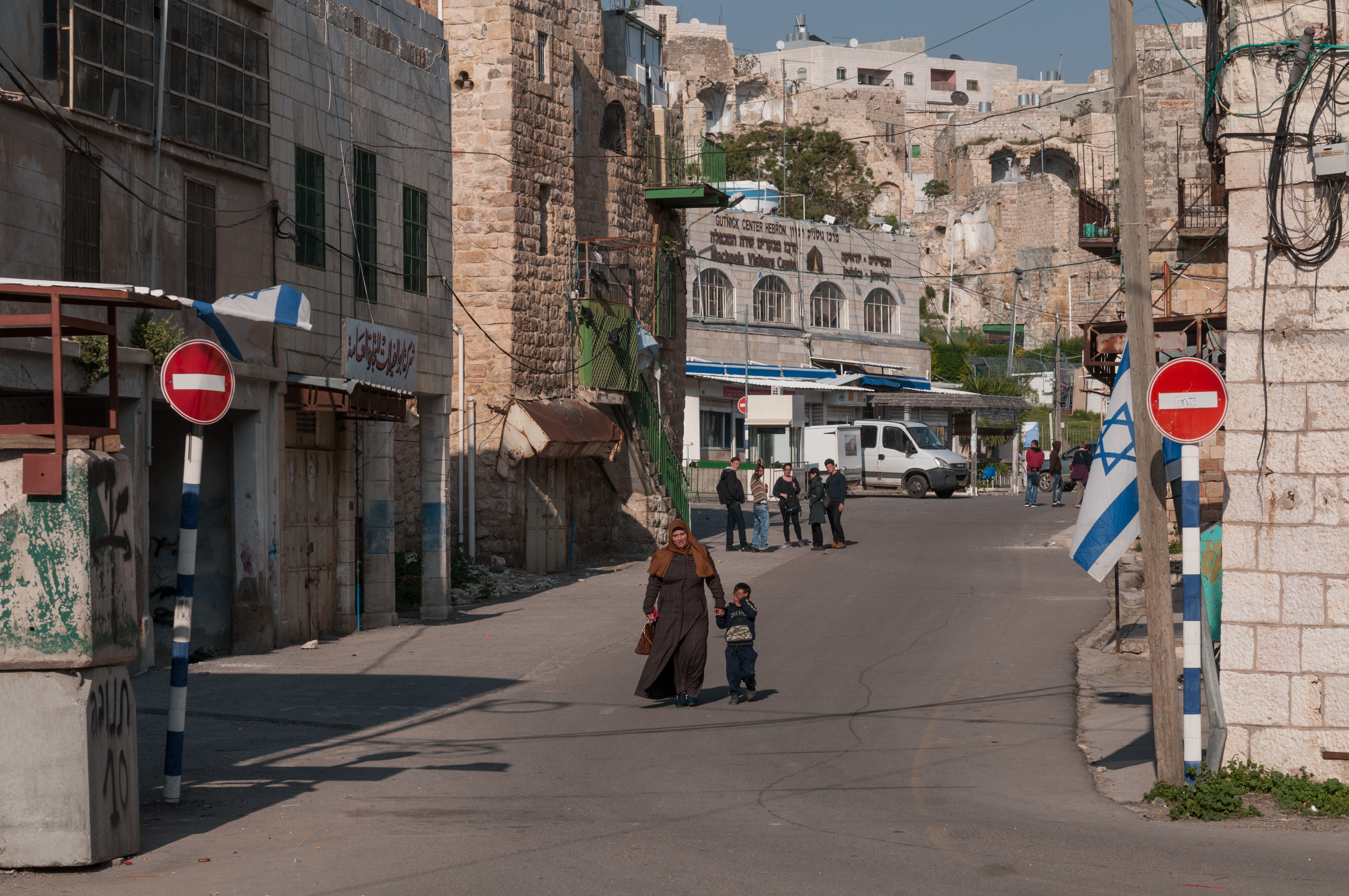
- Old City of Hebron
- Interactive map of Old City of Hebron
- Official name: Hebron/Al-Khalil Old Town
- Location: Hebron, West Bank, Palestine
- Includes: Cave of the Patriarchs
- Criteria: Cultural: ii, iv, vi
- Reference: 1565
- Inscription: 2017 (41st Session)
- Endangered: 2017–
- Area: 20.6 ha (0.080 sq mi)
- Buffer zone: 152.2 ha (0.588 sq mi)
- Coordinates: 31°31′31″N 35°06′30″E

The Old City of Hebron (Arabic: البلدة القديمة الخليل Hebrew: עיר העתיקה של חברון) is the historic city centre of Hebron. The Hebron of antiquity is thought by archaeologists to have originally started elsewhere, at Tel Rumeida, which is approximately 200 meters (660 ft) west of today's Old City, and thought to have originally been a Canaanite city. Today's Old City was settled in Greek or Roman times (circa 3rd to 1st centuries BCE). It became the center of the overall Hebron site during the Abbasid Caliphate (which began circa 750 CE).

It was recognized as the third World Heritage Site in the State of Palestine in 2017.

The Old City is built around the Cave of the Patriarchs, the traditional burial site of the biblical Patriarchs and Matriarchs, and venerated by Jews, Christians, and Muslims. The Old City is a sensitive location in the Israeli–Palestinian conflict in Hebron.

== History ==
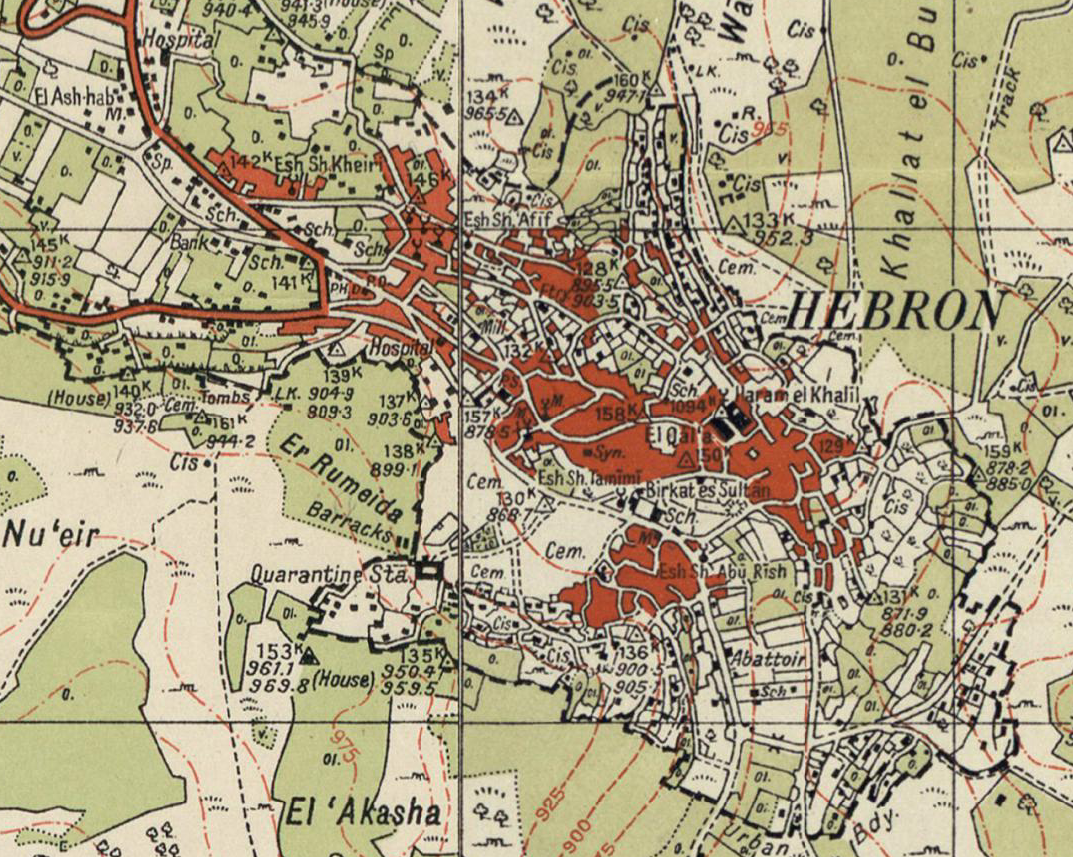
1940s Survey of Palestine map of the city

The present Old City was first settled in either the Greek or at the latest by Roman times. It was settled in the valley downhill from Tel Rumeida, considered to be the center of biblical Hebron. It was not until the start of the Abbasid Caliphate that the current city became the center of Hebron, building up around the focal point of the Cave of the Patriarchs.

The urban structure of the Old City of Hebron dates to the Mamluk period and has remained mostly unchanged. A majority of the buildings are Ottoman-era from the eighteenth century, along with some half dozen Mamluk structures. It is composed of a number of cell-like quarters with narrowly packed fortified houses functioning as a boundary to each area, with gates at the end of the main streets. It has an approximate area of 20.6 hectares (51 acres; 0.206 km^{2}), housing thousands of residents.

It became the third World Heritage Site in the State of Palestine in 2017, and was inscribed on the official List of World Heritage in Danger as "Palestine, Hebron/Al-Khalil Old Town".

2019 map by the United Nations Office for the Coordination of Humanitarian Affairs, showing the humanitarian impact of Israeli settlements in Hebron city. The Old City is mostly in the "Restricted Area"

The 1997 Hebron Agreement, part of the Oslo Accords, placed the Old City in area "H2", maintaining the Israeli military control which it has been under since 1967. According to Btselem report, the Palestinian population in the Old City greatly declined since the early 1980s because of the impact of Israeli security measures, including extended curfews, strict restrictions on movement and the closure of Palestinian commercial activities near settler areas, and also due to settler harassment. The IDF responded to the report by saying that "The IDF is well aware that curfews are seen as drastic measures, not to be used except for situations where they are essential for protecting the lives of civilians and soldiers ...Hebron is the only Palestinian city in which Israeli and Palestinian residents live side by side. Due to this, and the large number of terrorist attacks against the Israeli residents and the IDF soldiers protecting them, the city poses a complex security challenge." The efforts of the internationally funded Hebron Rehabilitation Committee resulted in the return of more than 6,000 Palestinians by 2015. In 2019, the Temporary International Presence in Hebron was expelled from the city. It issued a confidential report which found that Israel routinely violates international law in Hebron and that it is in "severe and regular breach" of the rights to non-discrimination laid out in the International Covenant on Civil and Political Rights over the lack of freedom to movement for the Palestinian residents of Hebron.

The rehabilitation of the Old City won the Aga Khan Award for Architecture in 1998.

== Landmarks ==
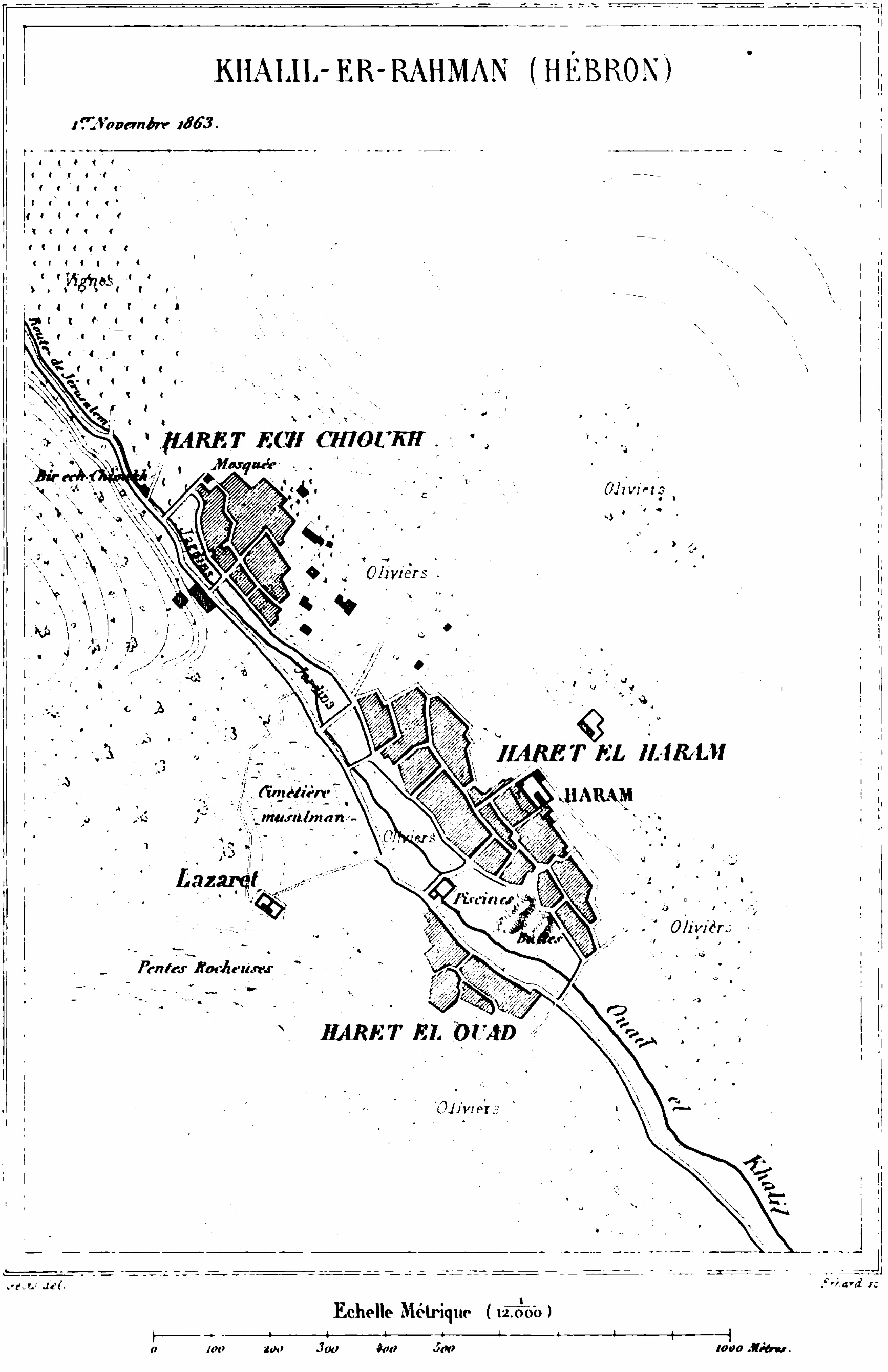
1863 (de Saulcy)

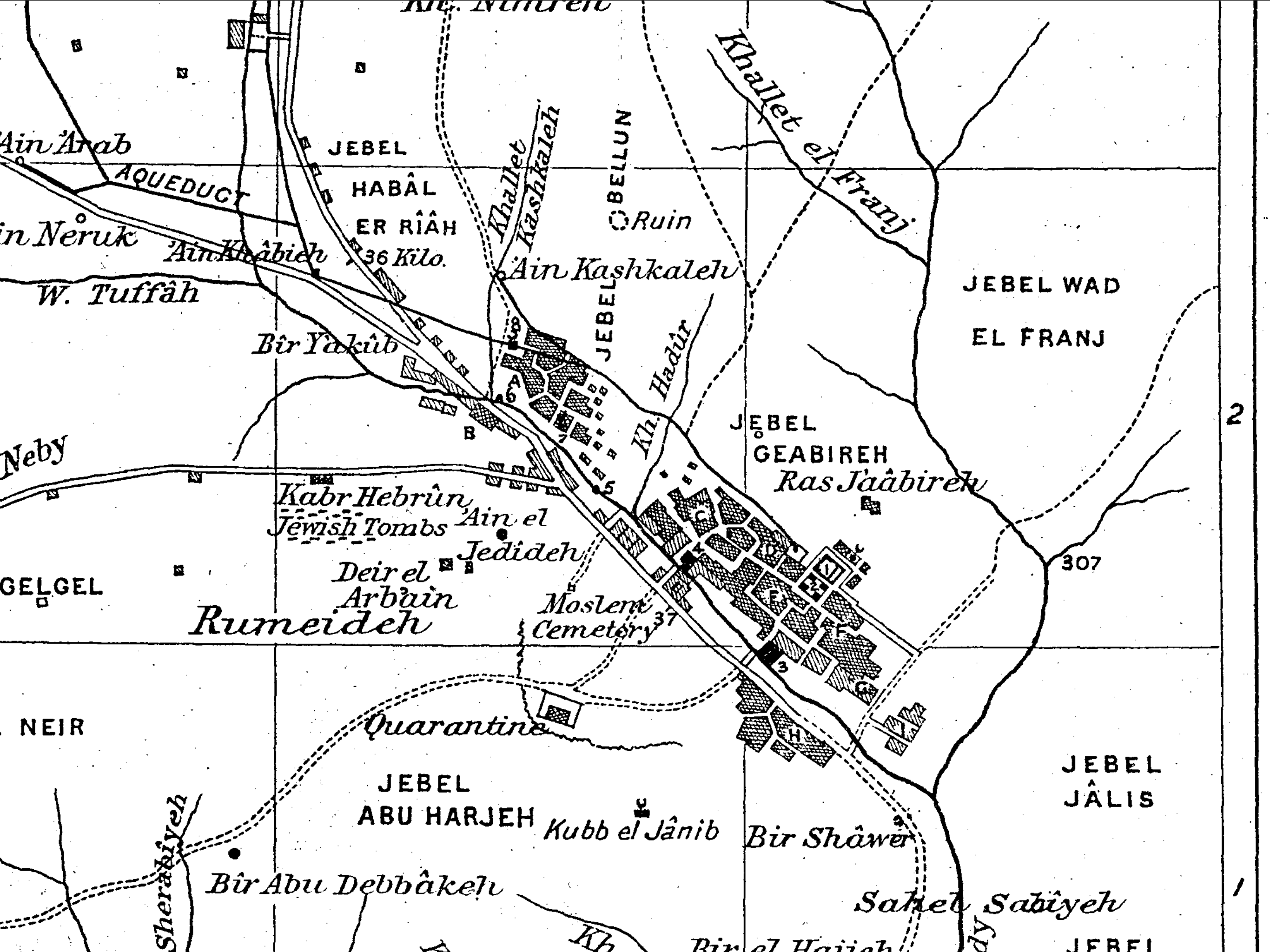
1898 (Schick)

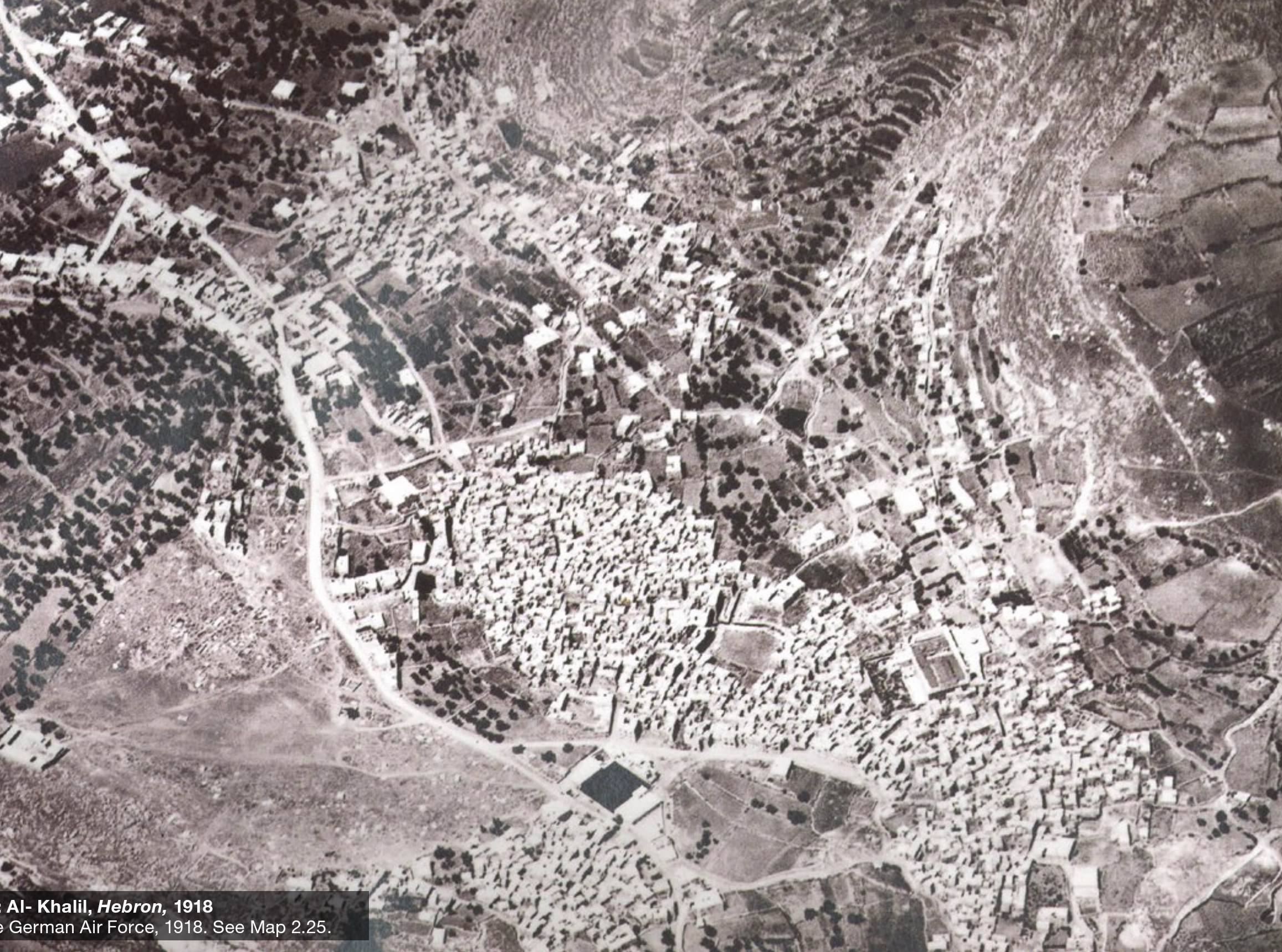
1918 (Luftstreitkräfte)

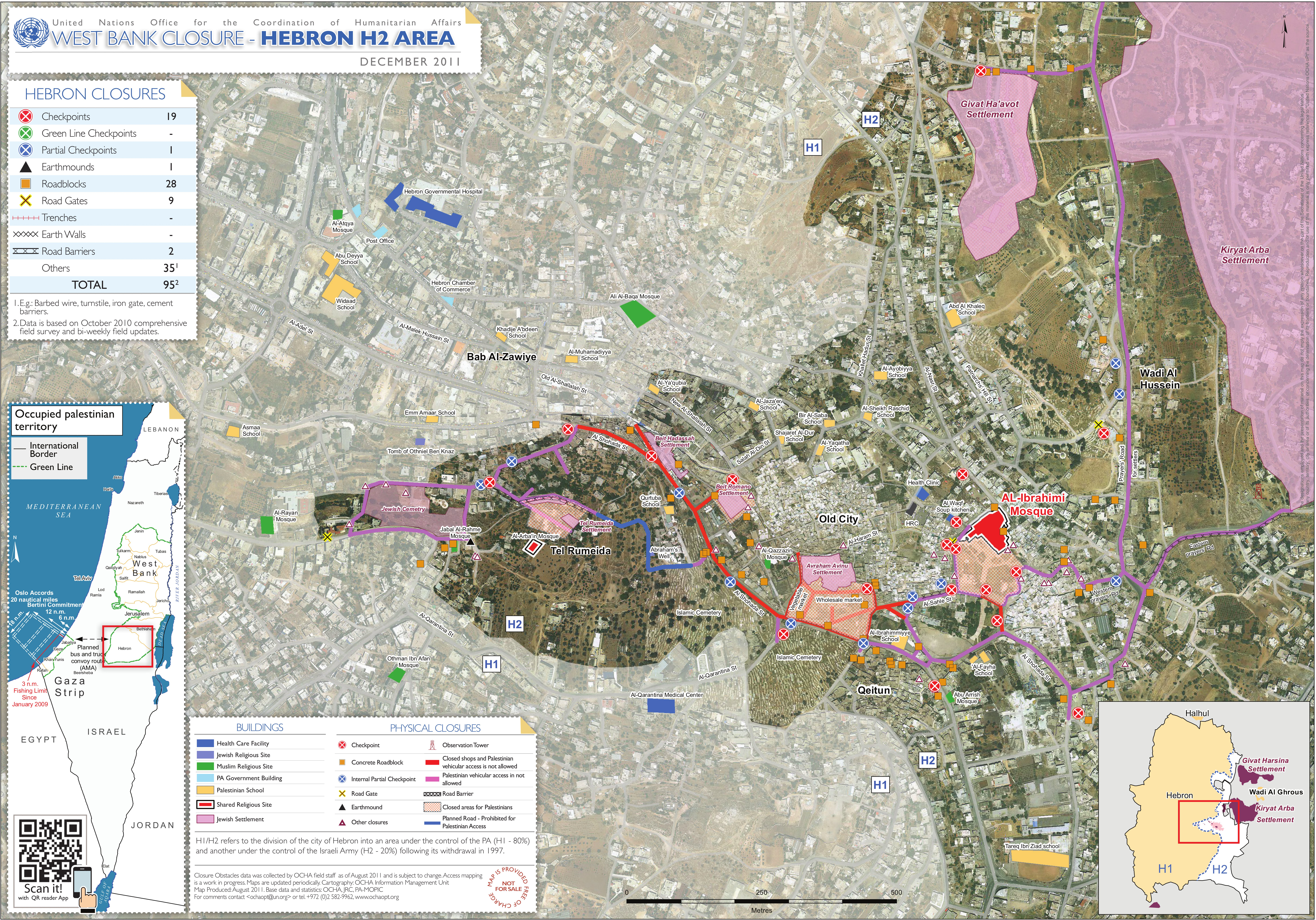
2011 (OCHAoPt)

The Old City of Hebron in two 19th-century maps, an early 20th-century aerial photograph, and a 21st-century map of Israeli restrictions on Palestinian freedom of movement. The 1898 map includes a legend as follows:
1. Tomb of the Patriarchs;
2. The Castle, partly ruined;
3. Pool;
4. Pool;
5. Old well;
6. Old well;
7. Bijurd mosque;
8. Aly Bukka mosque, "the second chief building in Hebron";

A. Sheikh 'Aly Bakka quarter Arabic: حارة الشيخ علي البكا;

B. Zawiya quarter (Haret ez Zawieh) Arabic: حارة باب الزاوية;
C. Glassmakers quarter (Haret Kezazin) Arabic: حارة القزازين (see Hebron glass);
D. el Akkabeh (quarter of the ascent) Arabic: حارة العقّابة;
E. Haram quarter Arabic: حارة الحرم;
F. Muheisin quarter (name of a family);
G. Cotton quarter (Haret Kotton) Arabic: حارة قيطون;
H. the eastern quarter (Haret Mesherky) Arabic: حارة المشارقة;

I. The new quarter Arabic: حارة الجديد

=== Places of worship ===
- Cave of the Patriarchs, including the Al-Jawali Mosque, the Uthman ibn Affan mosque and the Ibrahim hospice
- Sheikh Ali al-Bakka Mosque
- Qazzazin Mosque
- Avraham Avinu Synagogue

=== Museums ===
- Old City Museum, converted from a hotel to a museum in 2021

== Districts and subdivisions ==
At the end of the 19th century, the Old City was recorded as being divided into nine quarters:

- Sheikh 'Aly Bakka quarter Arabic: حارة الشيخ علي البكا;
- Zawiya quarter (Haret ez Zawieh) Arabic: حارة باب الزاوية;
- Glassmakers quarter (Haret Kezazin) Arabic: حارة القزازين (see Hebron glass);
- el Akkabeh (quarter of the ascent) Arabic: حارة العقّابة;
- Haram quarter Arabic: حارة الحرم;
- Muheisin quarter (name of a family);
- Cotton quarter (Haret Kotton) Arabic: حارة قيطون;
- The eastern quarter (Haret Mesherky) Arabic: حارة المشارقة;
- The new quarter Arabic: حارة الجديد;

The Old City includes three small Israeli settlements on its periphery – Beit Hadassah, Beit Romano, and Avraham Avinu – which have been described as forming a "loosely contiguous Jewish neighbourhood" or a "Jewish Quarter". The Jewish area in the late 19th century was in the Glassmakers quarter (Haret Kezazin).

=== Israeli segregation ===
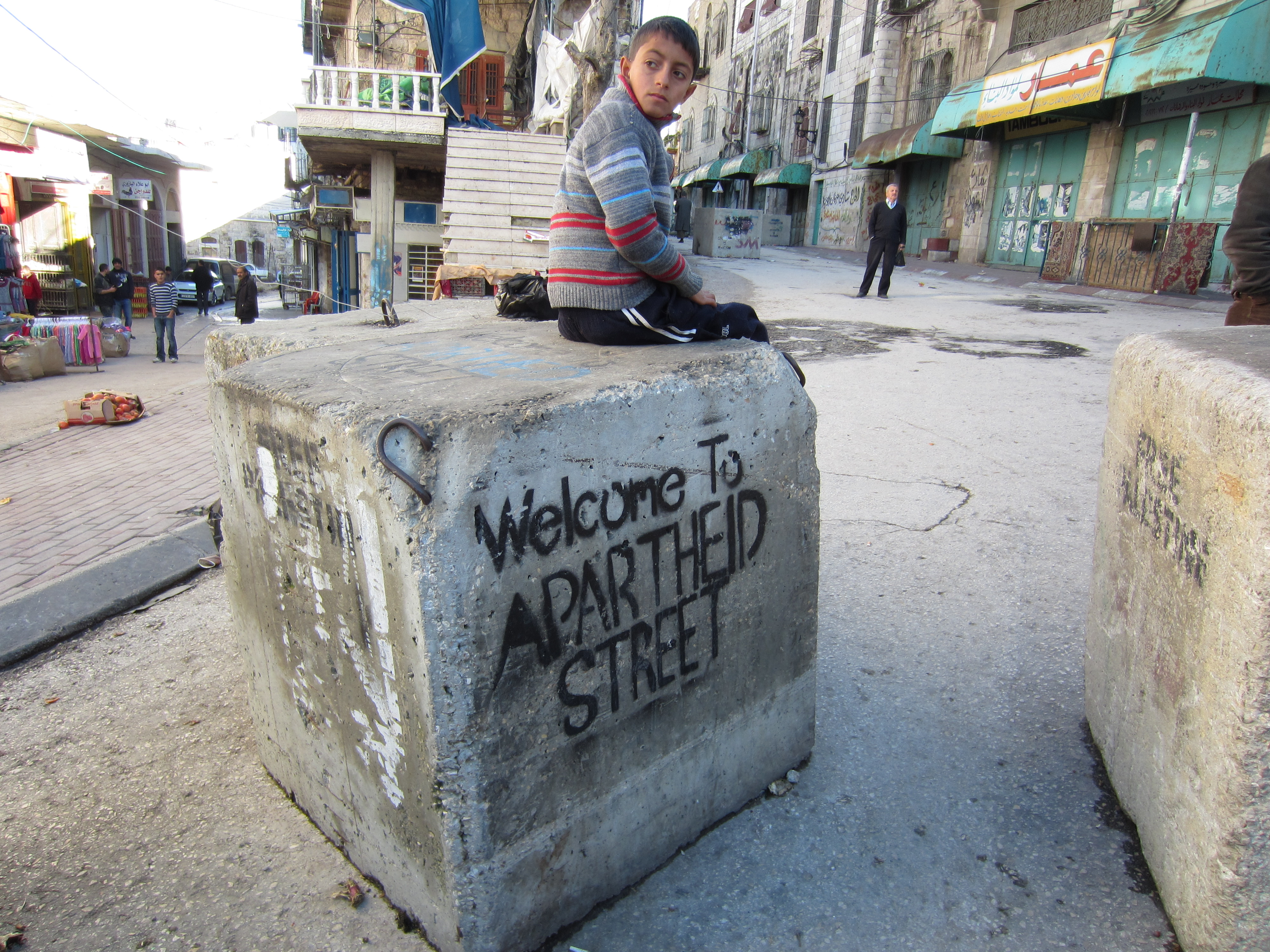
Sign at Al-Shuhada Street in the Old City of Hebron. It is nicknamed "Apartheid Street" due to it being closed to Palestinians.

The Palestinian population in H2 has greatly declined because of the impact of Israeli security measures, including extended curfews, strict restrictions on movement, and the closure of Palestinian commercial activities near settler areas, and also due to settler harassment. Palestinians are barred from using Al-Shuhada Street, a principal commercial thoroughfare that is locally nicknamed "Apartheid Street as a result.

== UNESCO nomination ==
The U.S has provided no funding to UNESCO since Palestine was admitted as a full member in 2011. The Obama administration cited a pre-existing law that prohibits funding any UN agency or affiliate that grants full membership to non-states, which was put in place after Palestine applied for UNESCO and WHO membership in April 1989. The U.S. and Israel were among just 14 of 194 members that voted against admitting the Palestinians in 2011.

The Executive summary, the Nomination Text, Annexes and Maps (all files located here) are the documents submitted by Palestine to the World Heritage Centre on 30 January 2017 and requested for expedited consideration on May 21, 2017. The International Council on Monuments and Sites (ICOMOS) subsequently sought access to the Old City of Hebron but Israel refused it entry because "On a strategic and principled level, the State of Israel will not take part in and will not legitimize any Palestinian political move under the guise of culture and heritage."

Reporting on the ICOMOS report, the Jerusalem Post noted that "the association of Hebron with Jewish and early Christian societies is given little recognition, and Tell Rumeida [an area of Biblical Hebron] and other sites are excluded from the boundaries," and that "the PA would have done better with an expanded timeline and larger geographical area of the city, which could have spoken of its importance to the development of three monotheistic religions starting from 2200 BCE." while also writing that "The absence of a field visit, plus the limited details of the Palestinian report, meant that ICOMOS "could not fully evaluate" the proposal or confirm that the site met the qualifications for inscription." and that "The actual text of the decision states that ICOMOS was not able to fully evaluate the site due to the absence of a field visit." and "The threats and violations reflect a long-standing and complex political situation" requiring "a political response". Professor and author Lynn Meskell compares the negotiations to list Hebron with the case of Battir, noting that Palestine had documented acts of vandalism, site damage and other attacks on the property and that the Palestinians requested the secretariat for a danger listing to ensure safeguarding and international standards of conservation. (Note: The ICOMOS report stated that: ICOMOS considers that the property is under threat as a result of a long-standing and complex Israeli-Palestinian political situation. Restrictions have been in force in the old town since 1967, and these were intensified in 1994 and following the Oslo Accords. As well as leading to boundary walls, new roads, and the construction of two settlements within the property, some demolition has taken place and conservation has been hindered. Moreover, the restrictions on free movement and the transfer of services to the periphery have had the effect of encouraging outward migration from the old town, although this is now slowly being reversed.)

Orly Noy, writing for +972 Magazine, says that UNESCO considers whether a site is worth inclusion in the list and which national entity it falls under, that the resolution does not deny the Jewish connection to Hebron or the Tomb of the Patriarchs and that resolutions about Hebron recognize the fact that the city is holy to Judaism, Christianity, and Islam; but Israeli Prime Minister Benjamin Netanyahu stated that a Jewish connection to the site had been denied. In a pre-emption of the Palestinian nomination, in February 2010 the Israeli government had adopted the National Heritage Sites project including the Cave of the Patriarchs as well as other Palestinian sites; the moves was heavily criticized by the Obama administration, and has been described as "ignor[ing] much of the cultural heritage of the land that cannot be characterized as exclusively Jewish".

Subsequently, in 2017, the U.S. announced that it was leaving UNESCO, citing anti-Israel bias, and Israel followed suit. This followed resolutions on Jerusalem in 2016 and the listed subject of this article. Washington's arrears at the time were over $500 million. Their departure took effect at the end of 2018. As Daniel Marwecki concluded in a 2019 analysis of why the U.S. and Israel left UNESCO, "the current episode in the diplomatic drama of how the Israel–Palestine conflict unfolds on the stage of UNESCO needs to be seen historically and in terms of the changing American strategic and tactical outlook towards the UN."

== Gallery ==
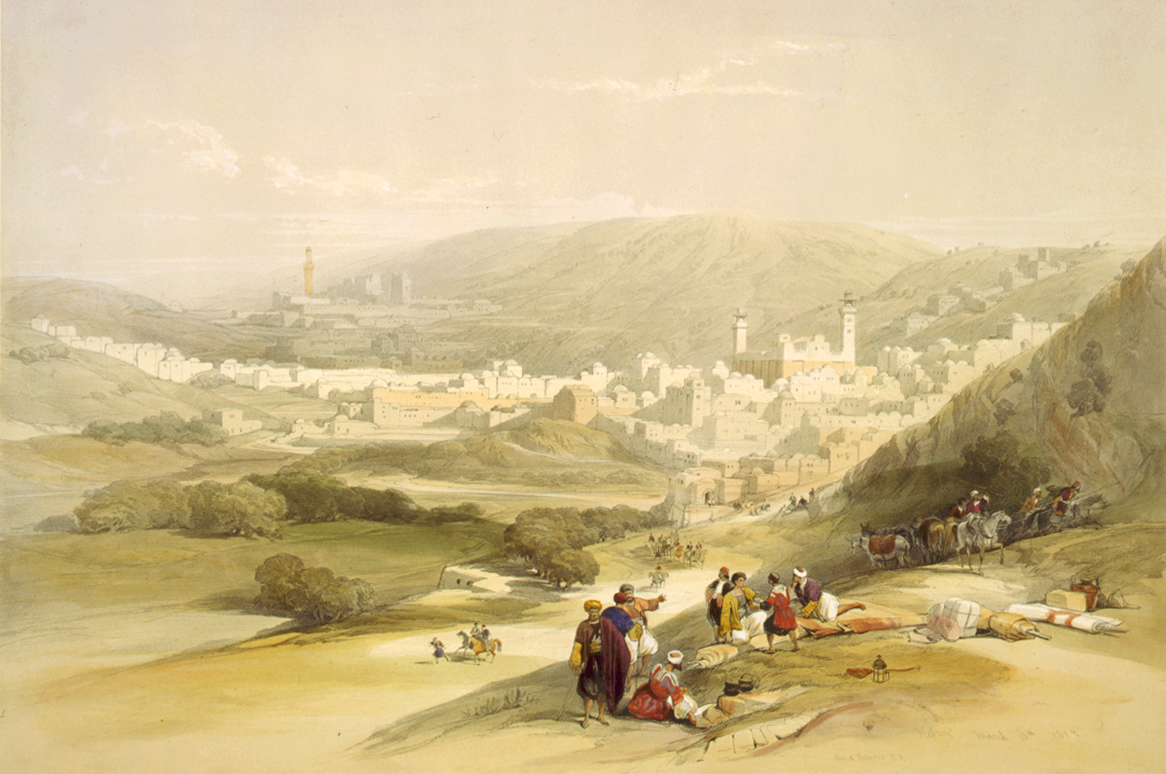
1839 print from The Holy Land, Syria, Idumea, Arabia, Egypt, and Nubia

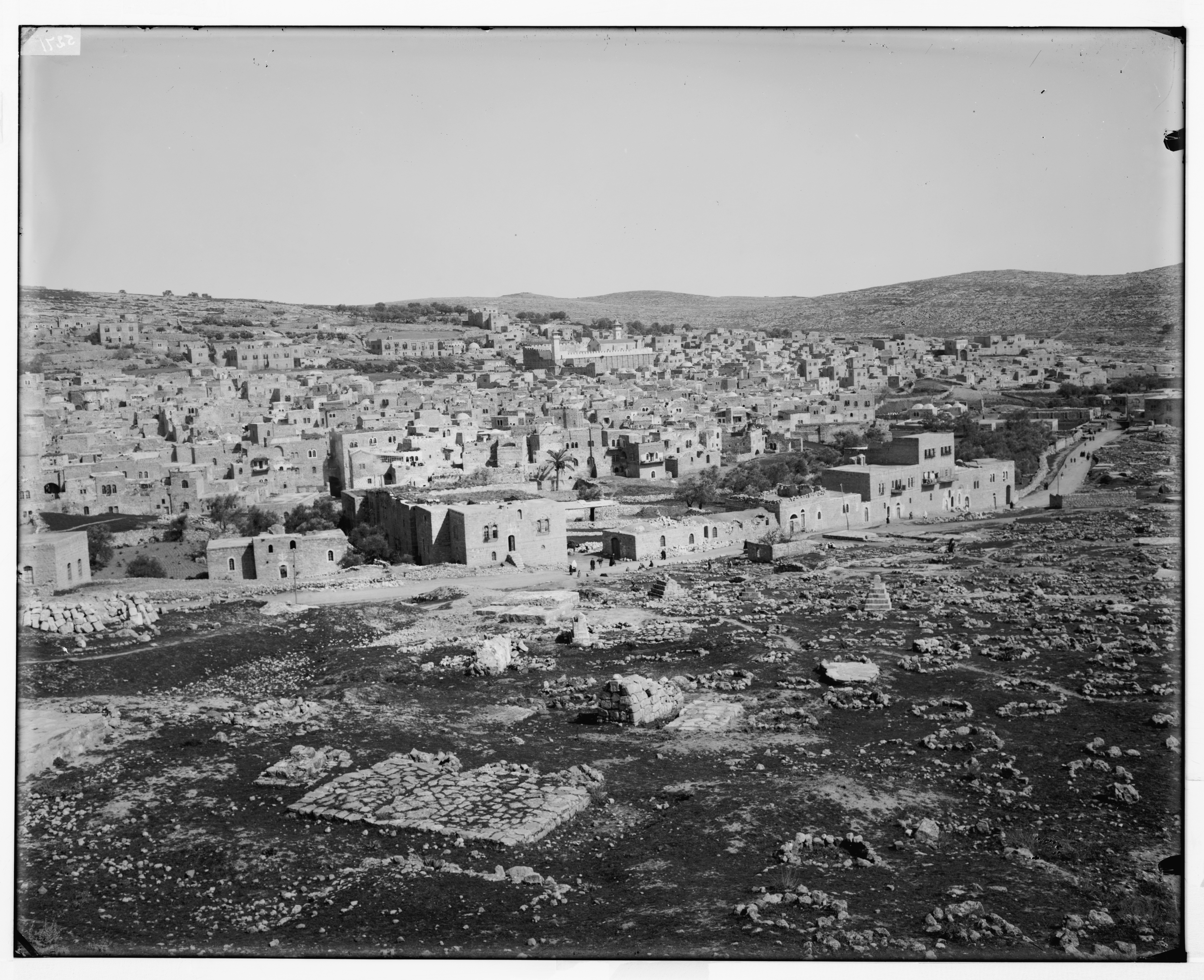
c.1910

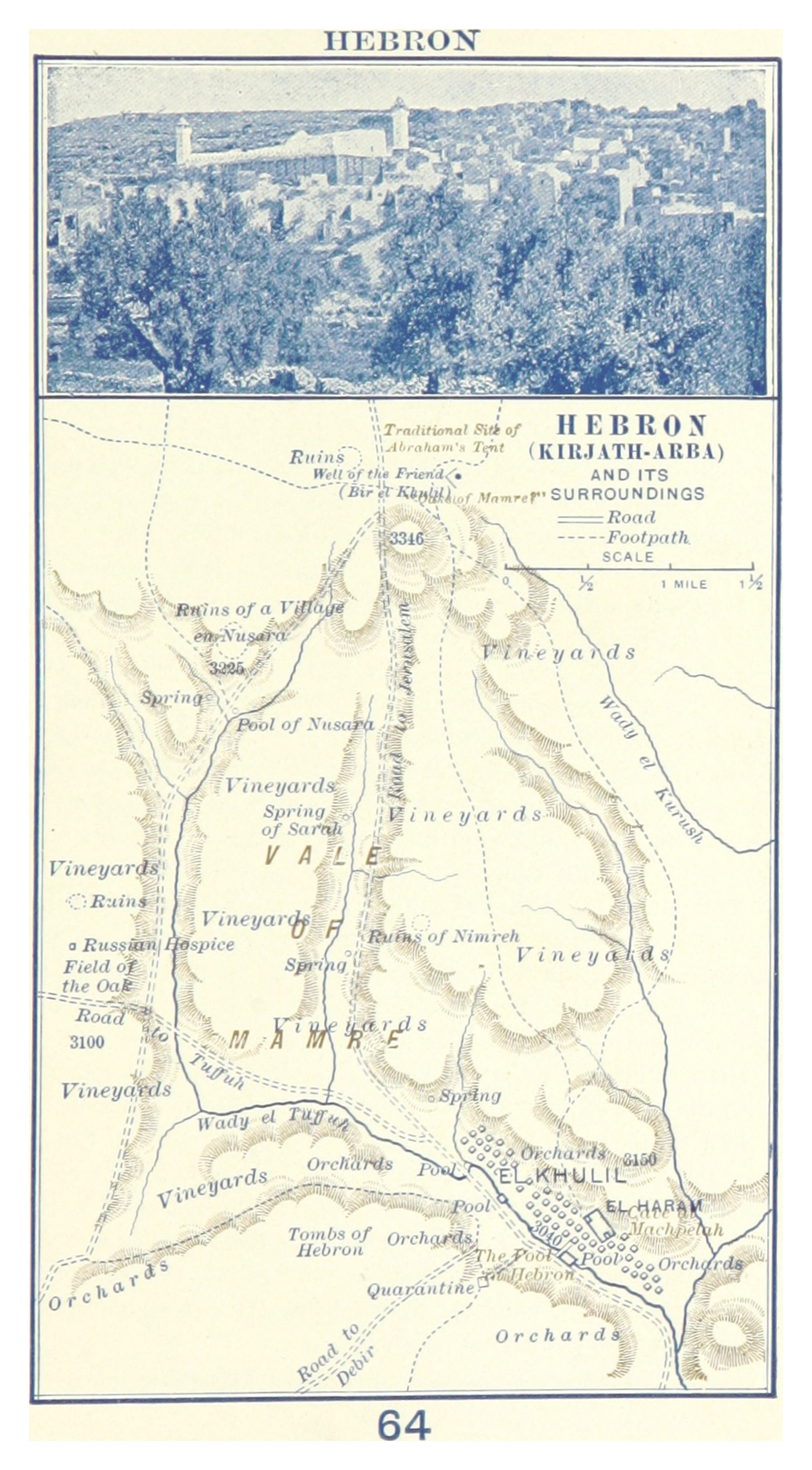
1899, Townsend Maccoun

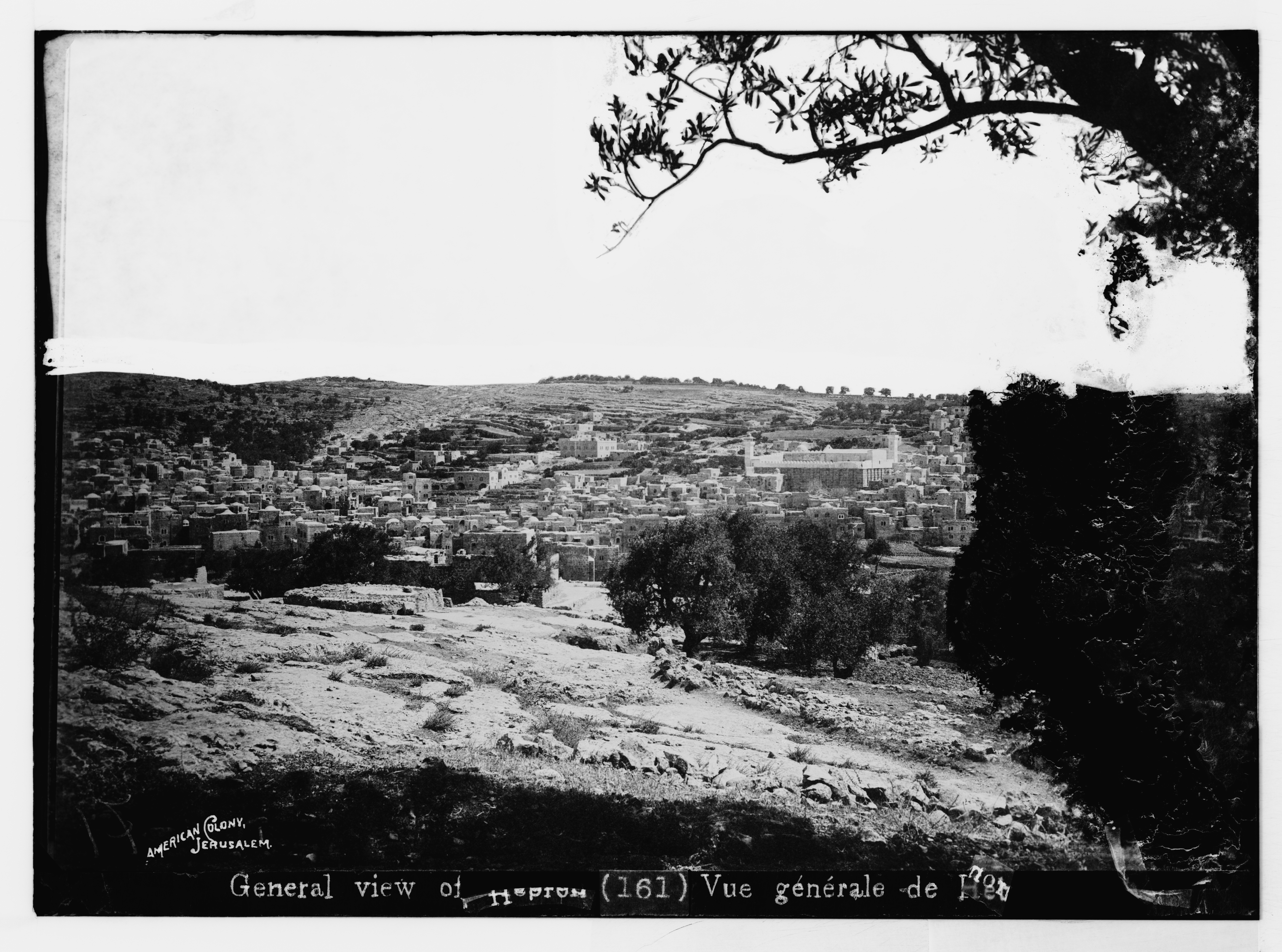
early 20th century

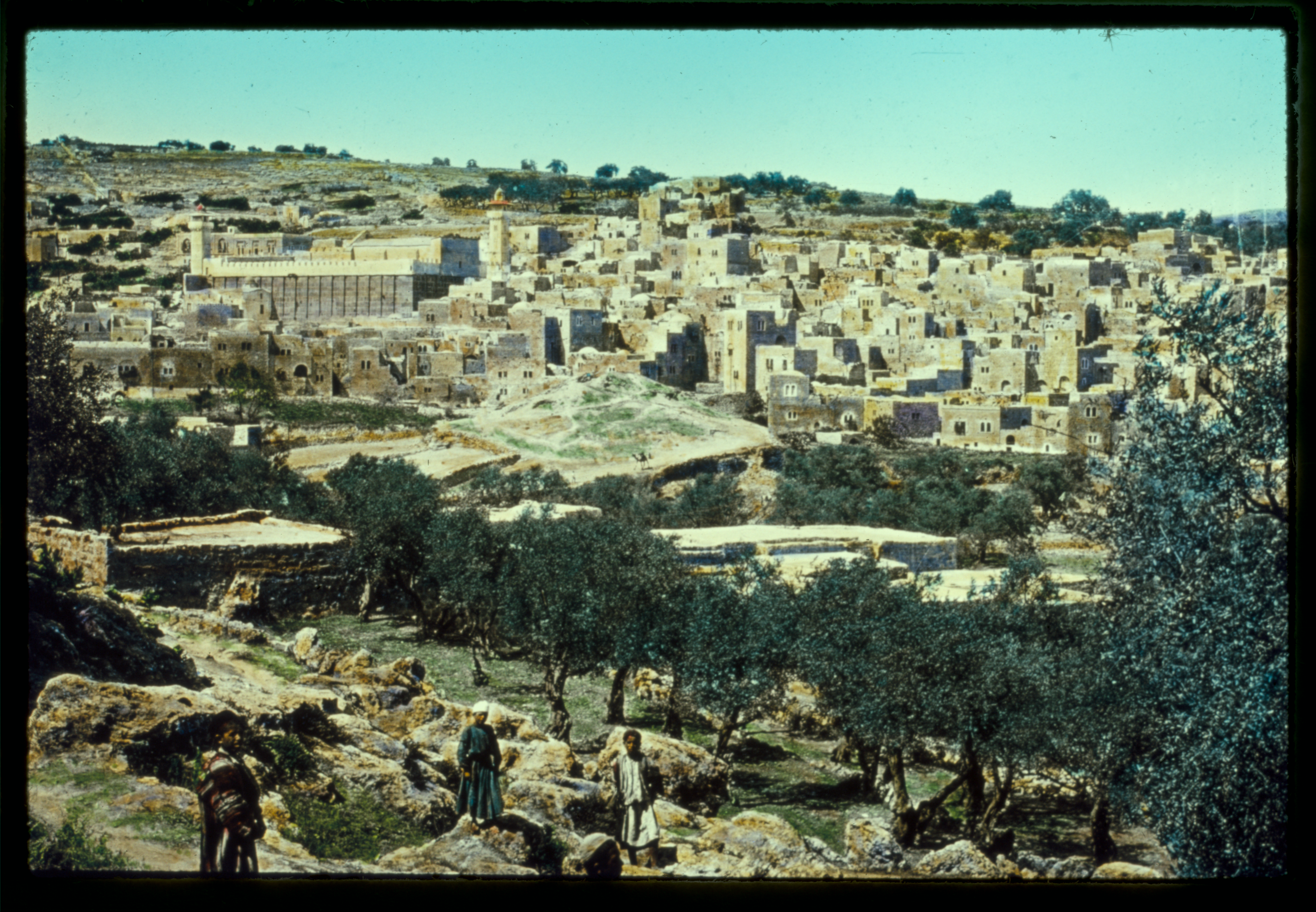
Colorized photo, early 20th century

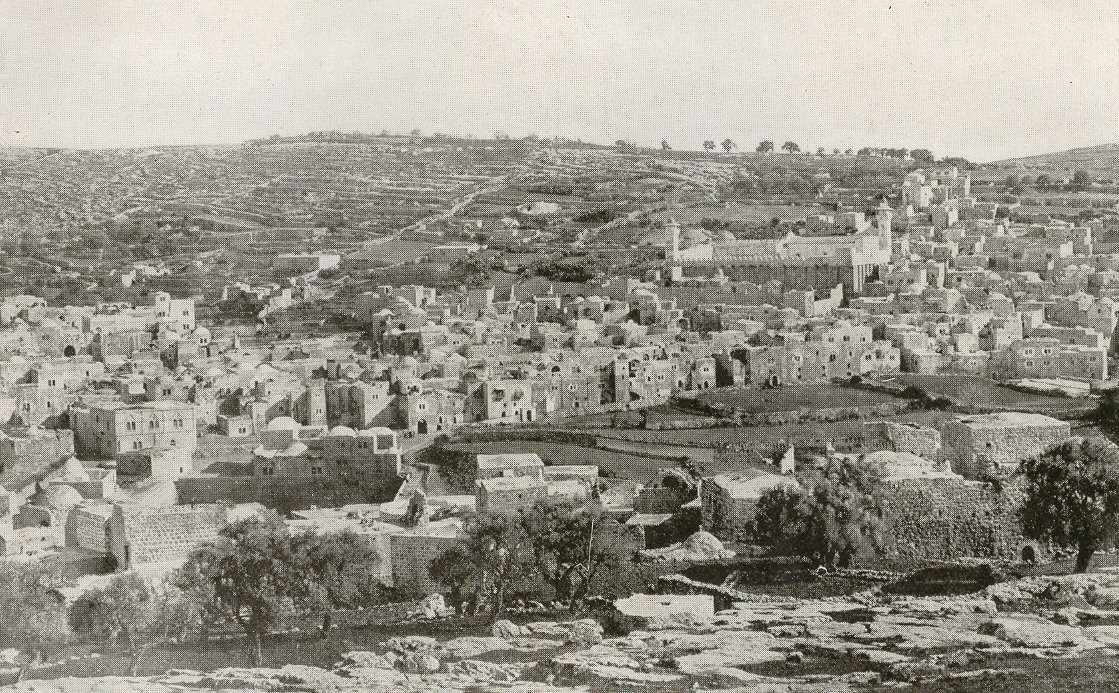
The Old City in 1910

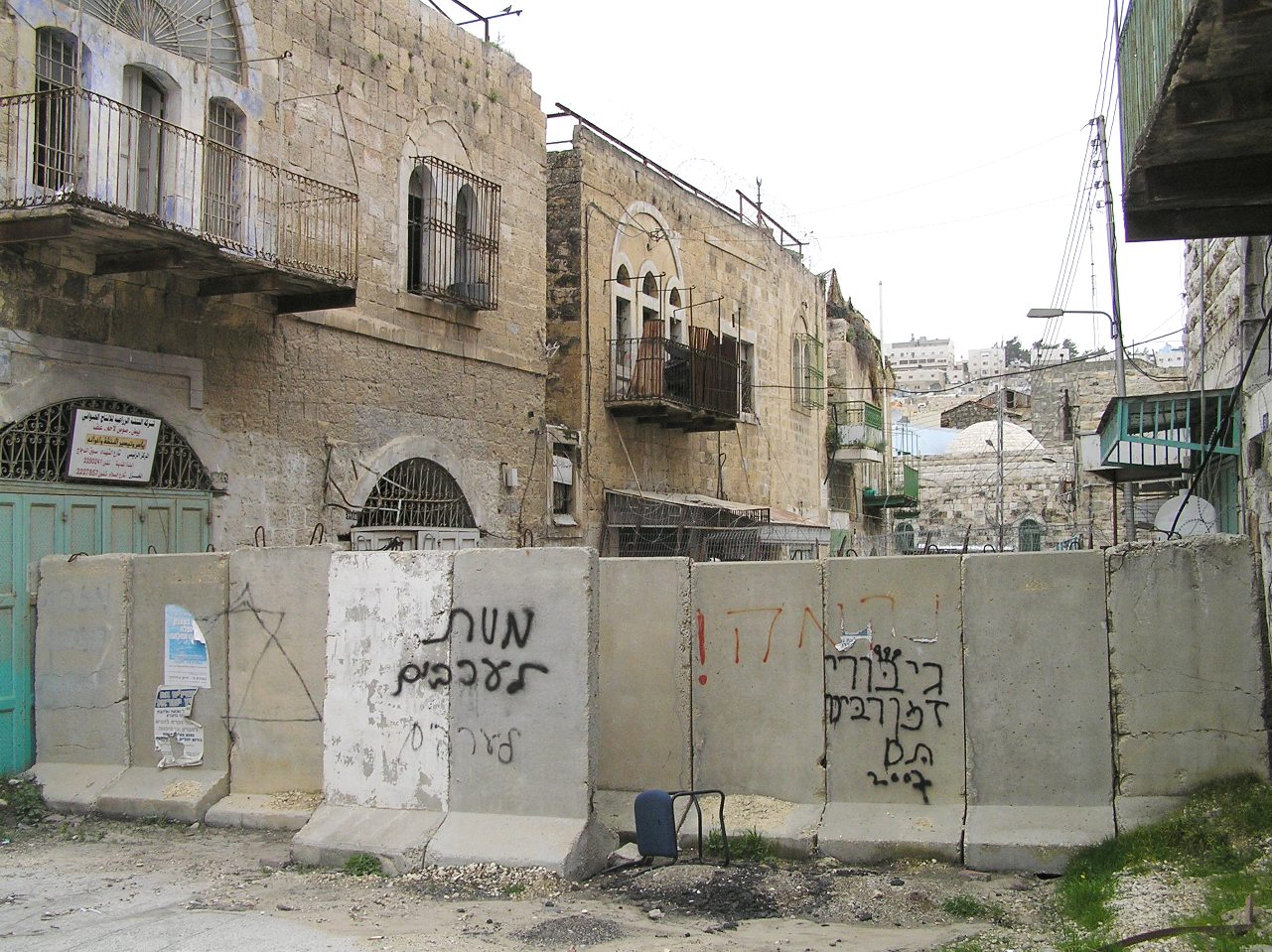
A barrier dividing sections of the Old City

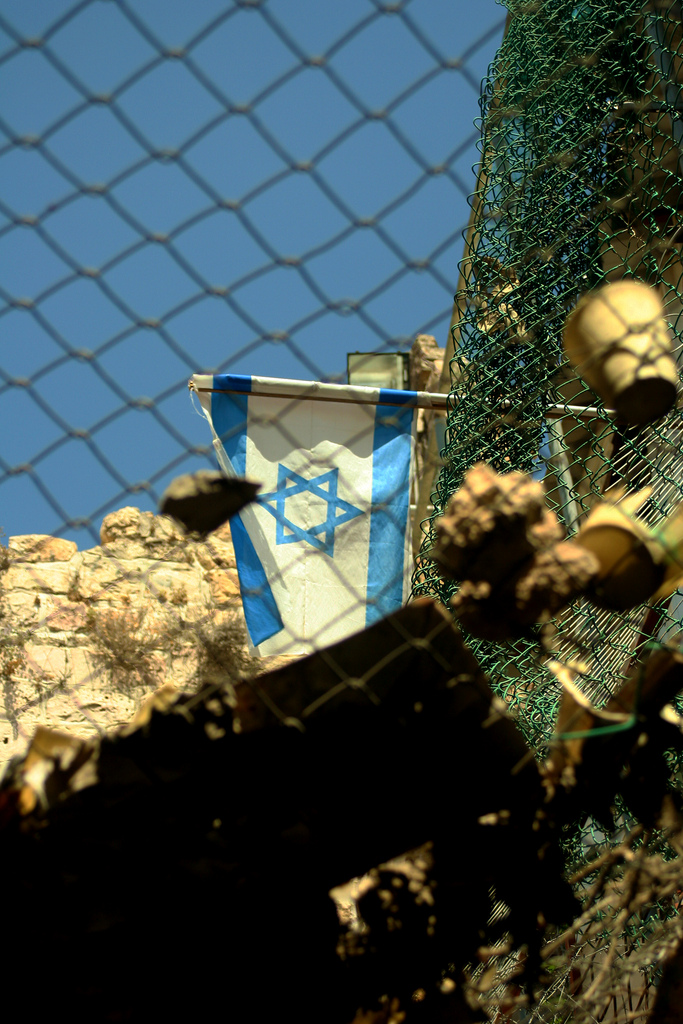
A net installed in the Old City to prevent garbage dropped by Israeli settlers into a Palestinian area.

1931 Survey of Palestine map of the old city (West)

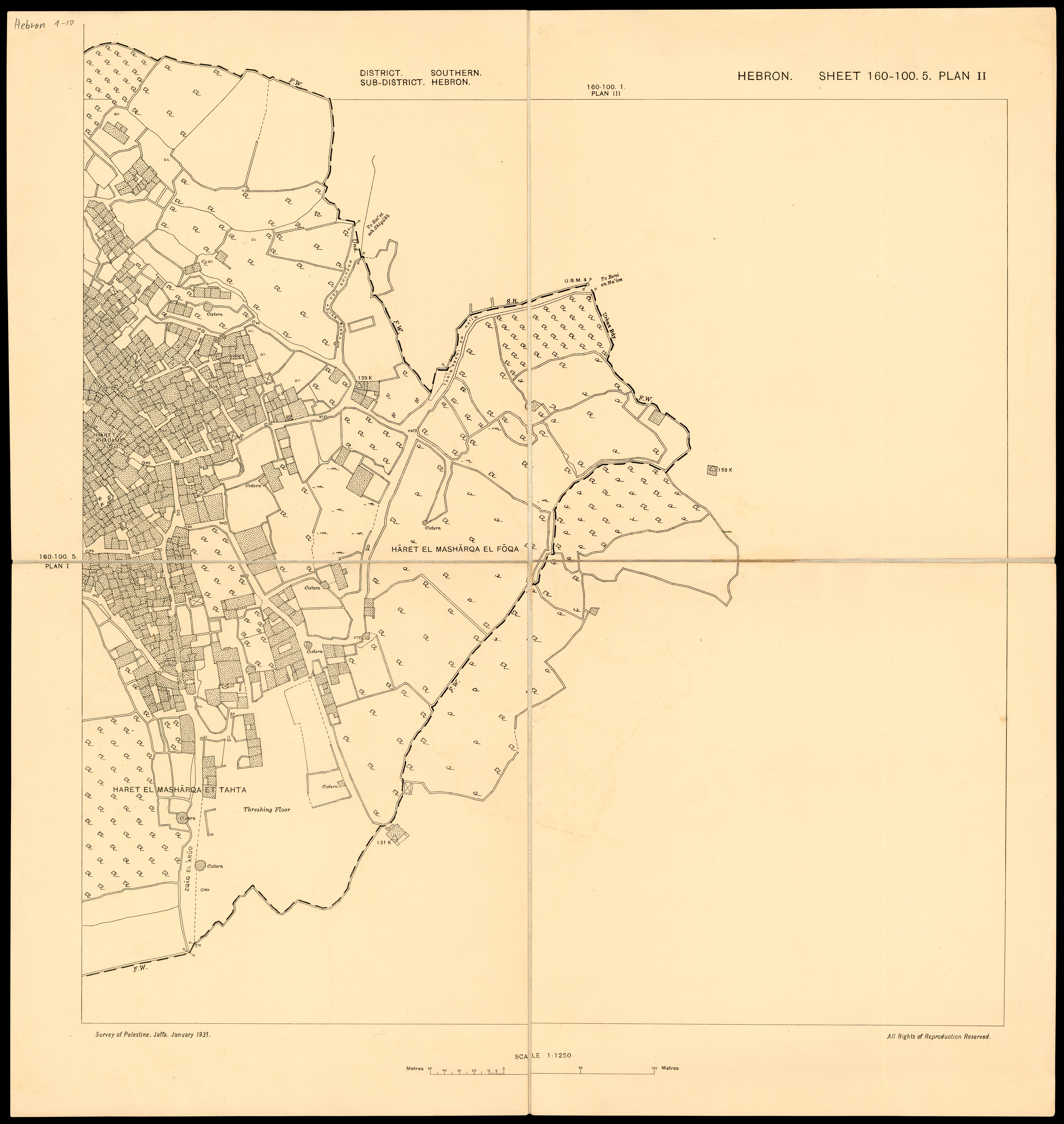
1931 Survey of Palestine map of the old city (East)

== See also ==
- Tourism in Palestine
- World Heritage Sites in Danger
- List of World Heritage Sites in the State of Palestine
- Israeli–Palestinian conflict in Hebron
- Occupied Palestine Resolution
