= Israeli–Palestinian conflict in Hebron =

Ongoing conflict in Palestine

Coordinates: 31°31′43″N 35°05′49″E

The ongoing conflict between Palestinians and Jewish Israeli settlers in the West Bank city of Hebron is part of the wider Israeli–Palestinian conflict. Hebron has a Palestinian majority, consisting of an estimated 208,750 citizens (2015) and a small Jewish minority, variously numbered between 500 and 800. The H1 sector of Hebron, home to around 170,000 Palestinians, is governed by the Palestinian Authority. H2, which was inhabited by around 30,000 Palestinians, is under Israeli military control with an entire brigade in place to protect some 800 Jewish residents living in the old Jewish quarter. As of 2015, Israel has declared that a number of special areas of Old City of Hebron constitute a closed military zone. Palestinians shops have been forced to close; despite protests Palestinian women are reportedly frisked by men, and residents, who are subjected every day to repeated body searches, must register to obtain special permits to navigate through the 18 military checkpoints Israel has set up in the city center.

== History ==
The Hebrew Bible describes Hebron as the home of patriarchs Abraham and Jacob and as all the patriarchs final resting place. It is also considered King David's first capital city.

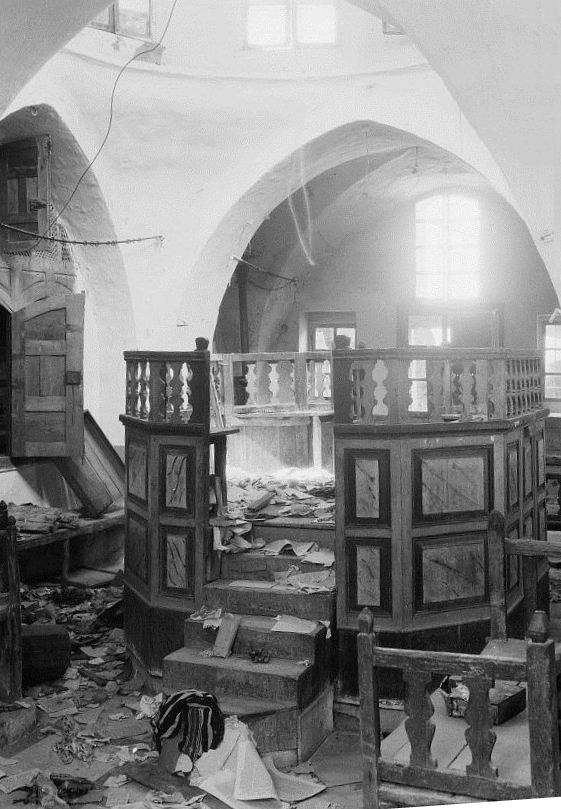
Synagogue desecrated during the 1929 Hebron massacre

In the mid-19th century, Hebron was small town with a population of around 10,000, the majority of whom were Muslims. From December 1917, Hebron came under the rule of the Mandatory Palestine, a move sanctioned by the League of Nations.

In 1929 when the Hebron massacre took place, Sephardic Jews and Ashkenazi Jews had been living in Hebron for about 800 and 100 years respectively. In the massacre, 67 Jews were killed by Arab rioters, and many incidents of rape, mutilation, and torture were reported. In 1931, 160 Jews returned to the town, but after further Arab unrest, the British Government decided to move all Jews out of Hebron "to prevent another massacre".

At the beginning of the 1948 Arab–Israeli War, Egypt occupied Hebron. By late 1948, part of the Egyptian forces had been isolated around Hebron and Bethlehem, John Bagot Glubb sent 350 Arab Legionnaires and established a Jordanian presence in Hebron. With the signing of the Armistice agreements the city fell exclusively under Jordanian control. In 1950, the city was unilaterally incorporated into Jordan.

== Israeli rule and Jewish re-settlement ==
Following the June 1967 Six-Day War, Hebron came under Israeli control. The vacillations in the Israeli cabinet after the war, over annexation and the political realism in wanting to maintain the majority Jewish demographic of Israel left the Israeli leadership in a quandary in ways to deal with the newly occupied territories. Israel's position was that parts of the West Bank be traded for peace with Jordan. Under the Allon Plan, Israel was to annex 45% of the West Bank and Jordan the remainder.

In an interview with the BBC on July 12, 1967, Former Israeli Prime Minister David Ben-Gurion declared that:

in the cause of peace, Israel should take nothing in the conquered territories, with the exception of Hebron, which 'is more Jewish even than Jerusalem'. According to Randolph Churchill, he [Ben-Gurion] argued that "Jerusalem became Jewish three thousand years ago under King David. But Hebron became Jewish four thousand years ago under Abraham and included a number of settlements that were destroyed two days before Israel was established."

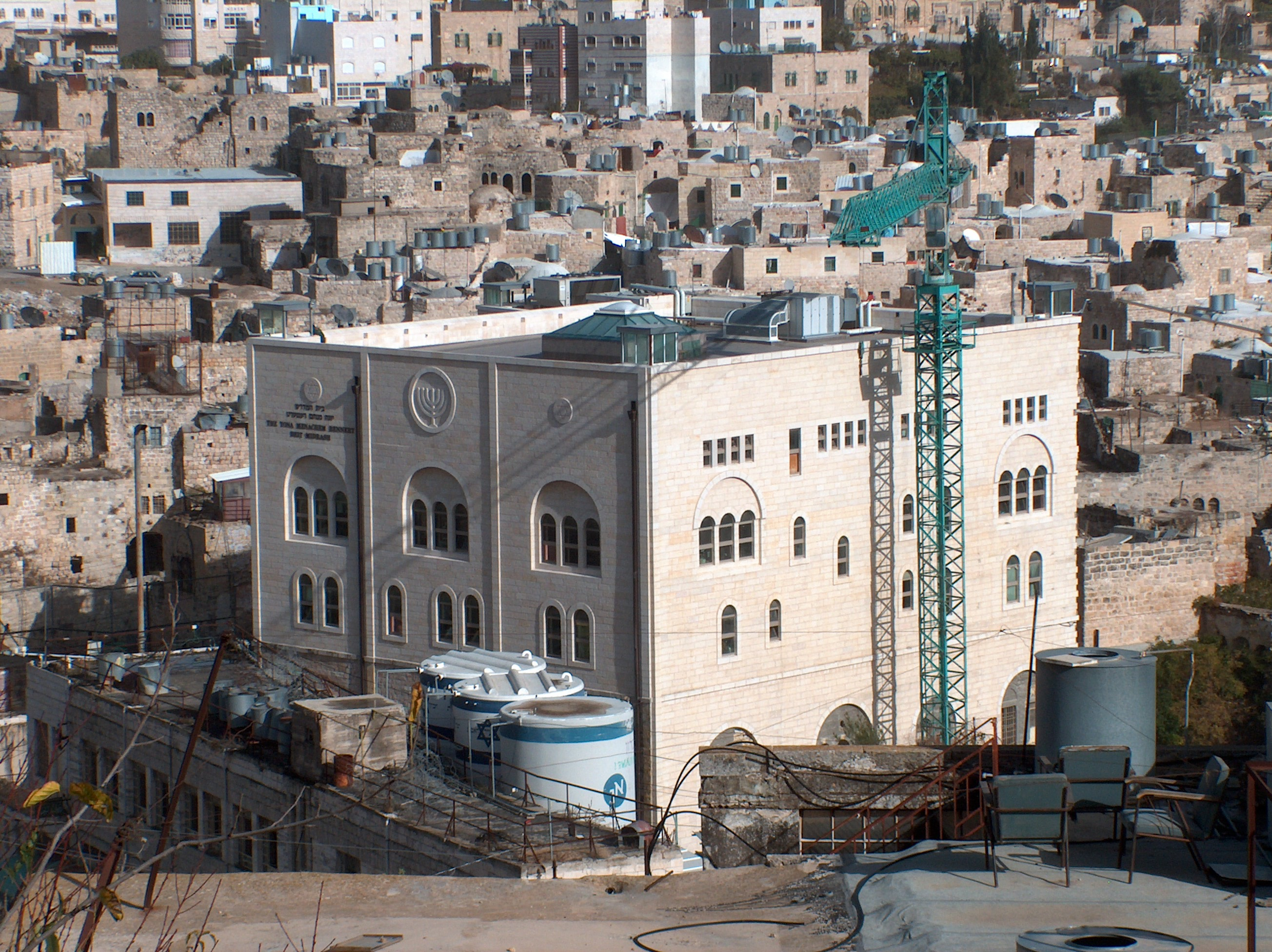
Yeshiva Shavei Hebron (website here) in the Beit Romano building of the Jewish quarter in old Hebron. The modern city is visible at the top.

In 1968, a group of Jewish settlers led by Rabbi Moshe Levinger, with the tacit support of Levi Eshkol and Yigal Allon, rented out the main hotel in Hebron and refused to leave. This was short lived and through a government compromise the Jewish presence was moved east to a nearby abandoned army camp. The new settlement of Kiryat Arba was established. According to the American Jewish historian Ian Lustick:

'The government was caught by surprise. Internally divided, depending for its survival on the votes of the National Religious Party, and reluctant to forcibly evacuate the settlers from a city whose Jewish population had been massacred thirty-nine years earlier, the Labor government backed away from its original prohibition against civilian settlement in the area and permitted this group to remain within a military compound. After more than a year and a half of agitation and a bloody Arab attack on the Hebron settlers, the government agreed to allow Levinger's group to establish a town on the outskirts of the city.'

Beginning in 1979, some Jewish settlers moved from Kiryat Arba to found the Committee of the Jewish Community of Hebron in the former Jewish neighbourhood near the Abraham Avinu Synagogue, and later to other Hebron neighborhoods including Tel Rumeida. They took over the former Hadassah Medical Center, Daboya Hospital, now Beit Hadassah in central Hebron, founding the committee. Before long this received Israeli government approval and a further three Jewish enclaves in the city were established with Israeli army assistance, and settlers are currently reported to be trying to purchase more homes in the city.

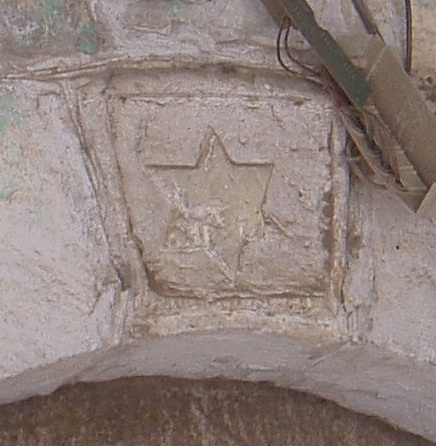
Star of David carved above entrance to a now Arab home in the old city of Hebron.

A total of 86 Jewish families now live in Hebron.

=== Post–Oslo Accord ===
On 25 February 1994, Israeli physician Baruch Goldstein opened fire on Muslims at prayer in the Cave of the Patriarchs, killing 29, before the survivors overcame and killed him. 24 more Palestinians were killed in the ensuing response to Arab riots, by Israeli police as local Palestinians protested and rioted, 6 on the following day at a demonstration in front of Hebron's hospital, and a further 18, (with some 37 more wounded) in ensuing clashes through till March 4. Two Israelis were killed and two wounded at the same time This event was condemned by the Israeli Government. The extreme right-wing Kach party was banned outright by the Israeli cabinet under 1948 anti-terrorism laws, following the group's support of Goldstein's actions.

The first Temporary International Presence in Hebron (TIPH) mission was established on May 8, 1994 as a UN response to the massacre. However the Palestinian Authority and the Israeli government could not reach an agreement on the extension of the mandate and the observers were therefore withdrawn on August 8, 1994.

A year later, on April 3, 1995, the Hebron municipality, through its mayor Mustafa al-Natshe, invited the Christian Peacemaker Teams to function as a violence-reducing presence. Opposed to all forms of violence (they have informed local Israeli settlers that they 'stood with whomever was on the receiving end of a gun barrel'), they now assist the local Palestinian community cope with the numerous restrictions—settler harassment, home demolitions, curfews and land confiscations—they are subjected to by the occupying power in what CPT, whose function is to monitor the tensions and accompany the Palestinian Hebronites on their daily rounds, calls collective punishment.

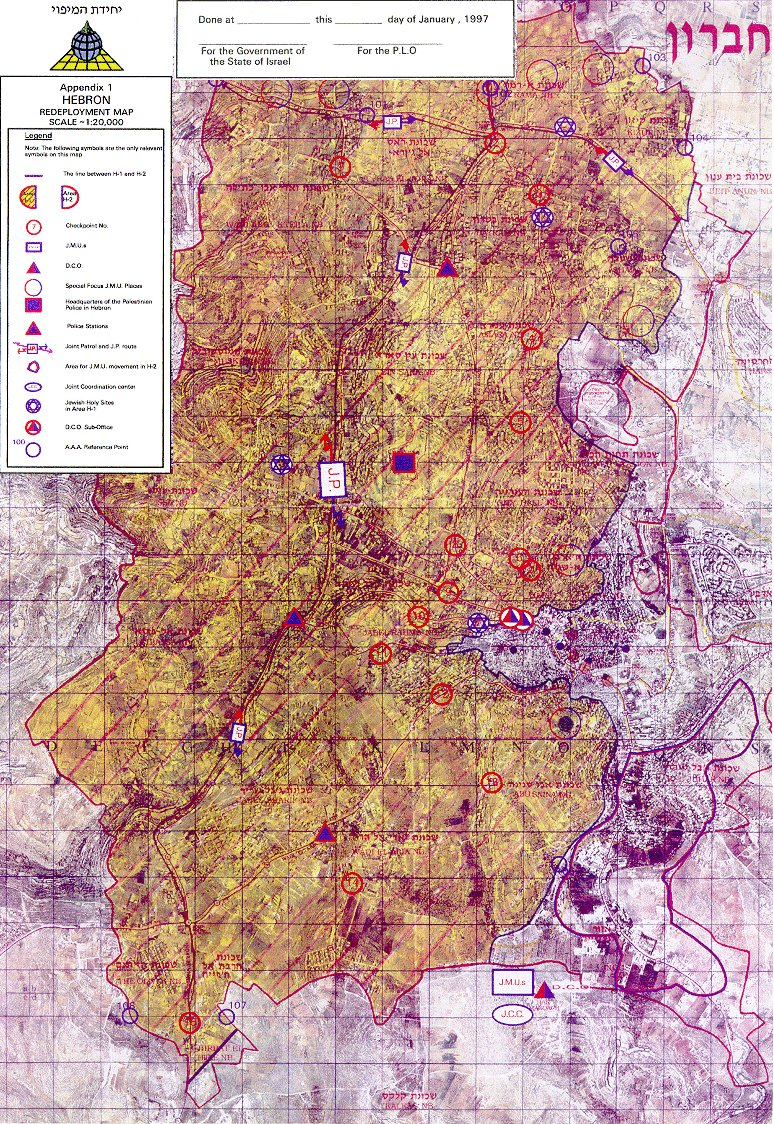
Official 1997 agreement map of Palestinian controlled H1 and Israeli controlled H2.

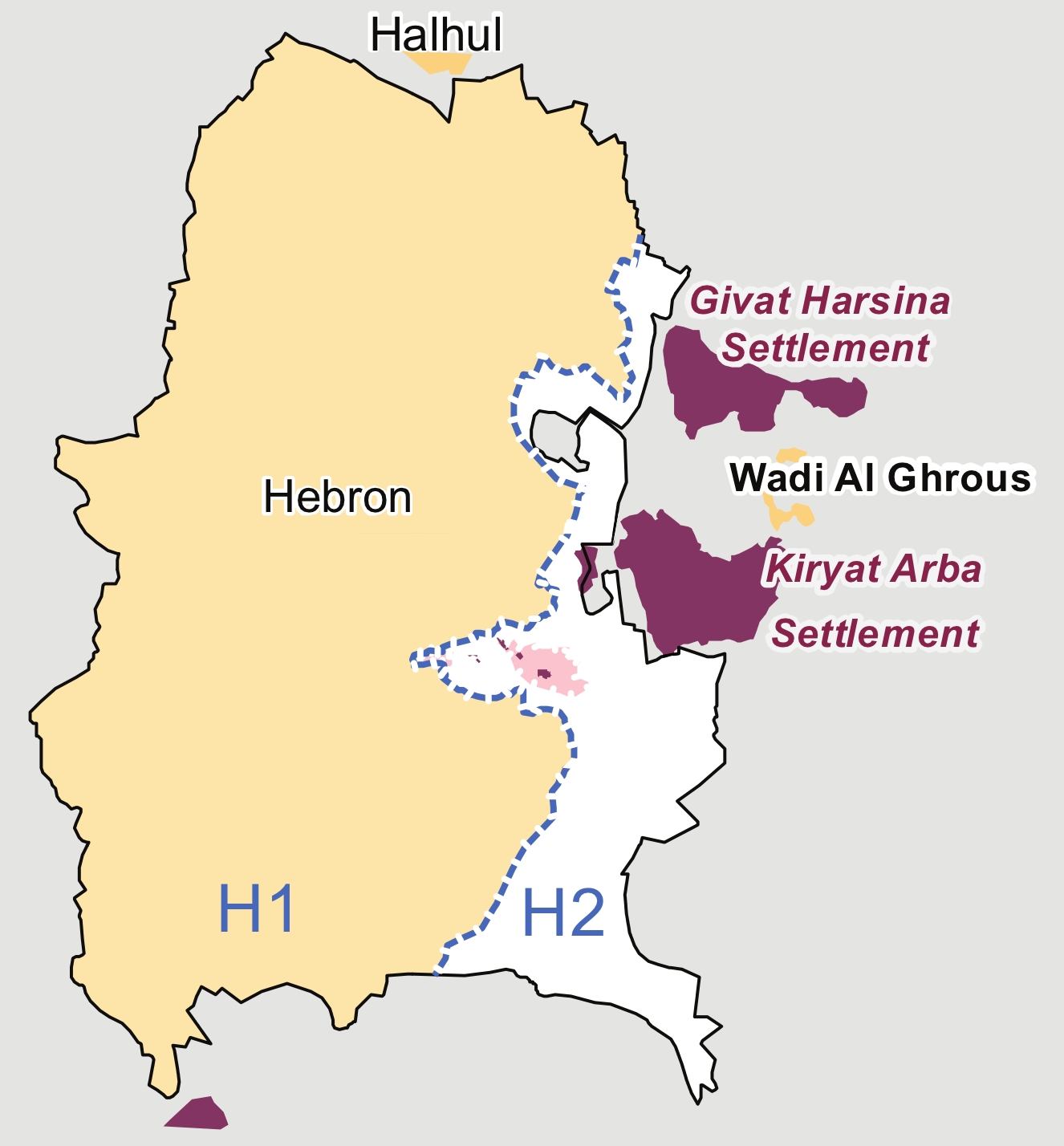
Illustration showing areas H1 and H2 and adjacent Israeli settlements

The redeployment of Israeli military forces in Hebron in accordance with the Interim Agreement on the West Bank and the Gaza Strip (the Interim Agreement or "Oslo II") of September 1995 was postponed on 28 March 1996. Since 17 January 1997, following re-negotiation of the Hebron Agreement, the city has been divided into two sectors: H1 and H2. The H1 sector, home to around 120,000 Palestinians, came under the control of the Palestinian Authority, in accordance with Hebron Protocol, shortly afterwards, Israeli and Palestinian joint units began patrolling the sensitive parts of the city. H2, which was inhabited by around 37,000 Palestinians as of February 2014, remained under Israeli military control in order to protect some 600 Jewish residents living in the old Jewish quarter, now an enclave near the center of the town. Renovation work that was being carried out on Palestinian homes prior to the Hebron agreement was halted on Israeli military orders. During the years since the outbreak of the Second Intifada, the Palestinian population in H2 has decreased greatly, the drop in large part having been identified with extended curfews and movement restrictions placed on Palestinian residents of the sector by the IDF for security needs, including the closing of Palestinian shops in certain areas. Settler harassment of their Palestinian neighbours in H2 was a reason for several dozen Palestinian families to depart the areas adjacent to the Israeli population.

The Hebron Jewish community has been subject to attacks by Palestinian militants since the Oslo agreement, especially during the periods of the Intifadas; which saw 3 fatal stabbings and 9 fatal shootings in between the first and second Intifada (0.9% of all fatalities in Israel and the West Bank) and 17 fatal shooting (9 soldiers and 8 settlers) and 2 fatalities from a bombing during the second Intifada. and thousands of rounds fired on it from the hills above the Abu-Sneina and Harat al-Sheikh neighbourhoods. According to Human Rights Watch in 2001, Palestinian areas of Hebron were frequently subject to indiscriminate firing by the IDF, leading to civilian casualties.

An international civilian observer force, the TIPH was subsequently re-established on 14 May 1996 to help the normalization of the situation and to maintain a buffer between the Palestinian Arab population of the city and the Jews residing in their enclave in the old city during the handing over period to the Palestinian Authority. On February 8, 2006, TIPH temporarily left Hebron after attacks on their headquarters by some Palestinians angered by the Jyllands-Posten Muhammad cartoons controversy. TIPH came back to Hebron a few months later.

The city of Hebron has been a major friction point, with Palestinians and Israeli human rights groups accusing the hard-line religious settlers of attacking the Palestinian population with impunity. According to Human Rights Watch, Hebron commander Noam Tivon stated:

Let there be no mistake about it. I am not from the UN. I am from the Israeli Defense Force. I did not come here to seek people to drink tea with, but first of all to ensure the security of the Jewish settlers.

Tivon maintained that the "Palestinian Authority is encouraging children to participate in clashes with the IDF by offering their families $300 per injury and $2,000 for anyone killed. He also said "the soldiers have acted with the utmost restraint and have not initiated any shooting attacks or violence."

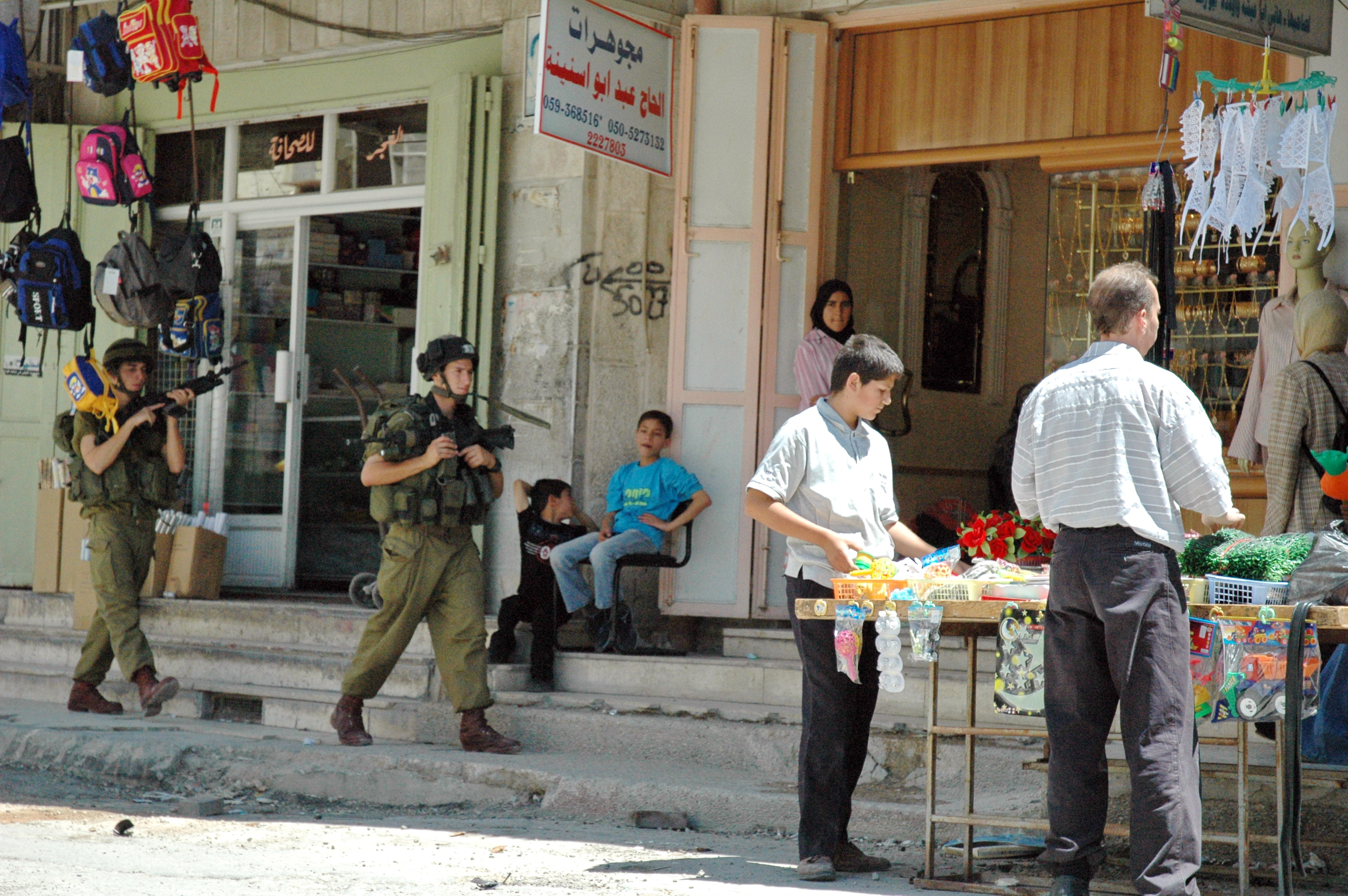
Open-air market in city being patrolled by Israeli troops (2004)

In 2008, the Israeli NGO Breaking the Silence documented alleged abuses committed by Israeli soldiers guarding the Hebron settlers, Mario Vargas Llosa claimed that local Arabs are "subjected to systematic and ferocious harassment by settlers, who stone them, throw rubbish and excrement at their houses, invade and destroy their homes, and attack their children when they return from school, to the absolute indifference of Israeli soldiers who witness these atrocities." Breaking the Silence was criticized for refusing to support its claims with evidence.

The documentary Welcome to Hebron asserts that settlers often harass the local Palestinian population. In the film, a former commander of the Israeli army, one of the leading figures in Breaking The Silence, shared his experiences as a soldier in Hebron. Israeli journalist Gideon Levi described the area around the Tel Rumeida settlement in the following terms:

There is no neighbourhood like this one. Not a day passes without the throwing of stones, garbage, and feces at the frightened (Palestinian) neighbours cowering in their barricaded houses, afraid even to peek out the window. Neighbours whose way home is always a path of torment and anxiety. All this is happening right under the noses of the soldiers and police, representatives of the legal authorities, who merely stand by.'

According to the Jewish residents, Palestinians regularly throw stones at Israeli children in school buses and playgrounds, leading to many injuries. Human Rights Watch reported that Palestinian gunfire has caused significant damage to many Jewish homes in Hebron, and an Israeli investigation found that the Jewish population felt "permanently exposed to Arab hostilities" due to frequent arson attacks, looting, and property damage.

In September and October 2008 reports stated to leak out about the possibility of a transfer of authority for security operations.

=== TIPH twentieth anniversary report ===
The TIPH issued a confidential report covering their 20 years of observing the situation in Hebron. The report, based in part on over 40,000 incident reports over those 20 years, found that Israel routinely violates international law in Hebron and that it is in "severe and regular breach" of the rights to non-discrimination laid out in the International Covenant on Civil and Political Rights over the lack of freedom to movement for the Palestinian residents of Hebron. The report found that Israel is in regular violation of Article 49 of the Fourth Geneva Convention which prohibits the deportation of civilians from occupied territory. The report also found the presence of any Israeli settlement in Hebron to violate international law.

== Rationale for Jewish settlement ==
The sentiments of Jews who fled the 1929 Hebron massacre and their descendants are mixed. Some advocate the continued settlement of Hebron as a way to continue the Jewish heritage in the city, while others suggest that settlers should try to live in peace with the Arabs there, with some even recommending the complete pullout of all settlers in Hebron. Descendants supporting the latter views have met with Palestinian leaders in Hebron. The two most public examples of the descendants' views are the 1997 statement made by an association of some descendants dissociating themselves from the then-current Jewish settlers in Hebron and calling them an obstacle to peace, and the May 15, 2006 letter sent to the Israeli government by other descendants urging the government to continue its support of Jewish settlement in Hebron in their names, and urged it to allow the return of eight Jewish families evacuated the previous January from the homes they set up in empty shops near the Avraham Avinu neighborhood. Beit HaShalom, was established in 2007. One of the purchasers is a descendant of Jews who fled Hebron during Arab massacres.

== List of incidents in Hebron ==
1953

22 December 1953. Four soldiers of the Israeli commando unit 101 under Meir Ha Tzion attacked a house on the outskirts of Hebron and killed two men and a woman occupant.

1968

October 9: a 17-year-old Palestinian threw a grenade at Jews praying at the tomb, injuring 47, among them an 8-month-old baby.

December 29: Palestinians attacked a security post.

1976

August 7: Palestinians shot at a tour bus, injuring two Jewish civilians.

October 3: a mob of Palestinians broke into the tomb and desecrated a number of Torah scrolls. 61 were arrested.

1980

May 2: 1980 Hebron terrorist attack: Six Jews were murdered and 20 injured at 7:30 pm Friday while returning home from prayer services on foot, in accordance with Jewish religious law on the Sabbath. They were attacked from behind with gunfire and grenades from the rooftops around a small alley.

May 21: a Jewish woman was injured when a Molotov cocktail was thrown at her car.

June 2: Israeli settler group based in Kiryat Arba set a bomb off in Hebron market 11 Palestinian civilians were injured.

1980

February 10: an Israeli was stabbed and injured.

1983

July 7: The commander of the central region ordered the dismissal of the municipal council of Hebron and of acting mayor Mustafa Natche (the Mayor, Fahd Al Kawasme, having been expelled from the OTP on 2 May 1980) and appointed a Jewish member of the civilian administration to the post of mayor of Hebron municipality. Mustafa Natche was able to re-take his post again in April 1994.

July: 3 Palestinians killed Aharon Gross, an 18-year-old Jewish student, in a crowded market by slitting his throat.

July 25: 3 Palestinian students killed in an attack on the Islamic College in Hebron.

1985

August 10: an Israeli resident was stabbed in the Hebron casbah.

1986

April 25: a 16-year-old Jew was stabbed.

June 6: a Jewish resident was stabbed and injured.

September 14: a Palestinian woman stabbed an Israeli soldier in the tomb.

October 16: a Jewish resident was stabbed.

1988

September: Zein Moh'd Ghazi Karaki was shot to death.

September 30: Palestinian shoe store owner Kayed Hassan Salah was shot dead and a customer was wounded by Rabbi Moshe Levinger.

1989

28 August: Bayiha Najar Nawaj'a was killed in the centre of Hebron, allegedly by Israeli settlers.

1992

February 4: Mustafa Akawi died under interrogation in the GSS interrogation wing of the Hebron prison.

October 25: Arab terrorists opened fire on Israeli soldiers, killing 1 and injuring 2.

1993

March 23: Musa Abu Sabha stabbed and wounded a settler in Susia, south of Hebron. He was subdued and found to be carrying a knife and grenade. Yoram Skolnik then fired several shots and killed Musa Abu Sabha.

May 28: Erez Shmuel, a yeshiva student, was stabbed to death by Palestinian terrorists.

September 16: Palestinians celebrating in support of the Israeli-Palestinian accord in Halhul village came under fire from Israeli troops and as a result, a young Palestinian was injured.

October 5: Israeli troops shot and injured a Palestinian.

November 7: Efraim Ayubi of Kfar Darom, Rabbi Chaim Druckman's personal driver, was shot to death by Palestinian gunmen and the Rabbi wounded near Hebron. Hamas publicly claimed responsibility for the murder. Settlers then rioted wounding 3 Palestinians.

November 14: Jewish settlers shot and killed a young Palestinian after he stabbed and injured a settler near the Ibrahimi Mosque.

November 16: Jewish settlers overturned market stalls, smashed cars and broke car windshields.

December 3: A young Palestinian was shot and injured by Jewish settlers in Hebron.

December 5: A group of Jewish settlers from Kiryat Arba ambushed and killed a Palestinian resident from Hebron. The killing triggered demonstrations and protests all over the West Bank.

December 6: Mordechai Lapid and his son Shalom Lapid, age 19, were shot to death by Palestinian gunmen near Hebron. Hamas publicly claimed responsibility for the attack.

December 10: Three Palestinians, two brothers and a cousin, were assassinated by Jewish settlers while sitting in a parked car near Hebron.

1994

January 13: three Israeli soldiers were injured after being shot at by Palestinians in an ambush near Hebron.

January 14: Israeli troops fired anti-tank rockets into a house near Hebron, killing the four Palestinians who were barricaded in the house.

January 18: Israeli troops opened fire during clashes with Palestinian demonstrators injuring 9 in Hebron.

February: Three Israeli settlers were shot and injured by Palestinian gunmen in an ambush near Hebron.

February 17: Yuval Golan, stabbed on December 29, 1993, by a Palestinian gunman near Adarim in the Hebron area, died of his wounds.

February 18: An Israeli settler's car was ambushed by a Hamas unit near Hebron, killing a pregnant Jewish settler.

February 25: The Goldstein attack on Muslims at prayer in the Ibrahimi Mosque, 29 Palestinians killed. In the ensuing riots in the West Bank, Jerusalem and Gaza Strip a further 125 Palestinians were killed.

April 7: It was claimed that a settler deliberately ran his car into a Palestinian and his 5-year-old son. Israeli police said that it was a car accident.

May 17: Rafael Yairi (Klumfenbert), 36, of Kiryat Arba, and Margalit Ruth Shohat, 48, of Ma'ale Levona, were killed when their car was fired upon by gunmen in a passing car near Beit Haggai, south of Hebron.

June 4: A home-made grenade was hurled at an Israeli army post injuring 6 Palestinians. The IDF opened fire at stone throwers and injured 8 of them. In a clash following this incident, 4 soldiers and 6 Palestinians were injured.

June 17: Israeli troops shot and wounded four Palestinians during clashes.

July 7: Sarit Prigal, a 17-year-old Israeli resident, was killed in a Palestinian drive-by-shooting.

July 18: Israeli troops shot and wounded two Palestinians.

July 22: 17 Palestinians were injured in clashes with Israeli troops.

August 26: Israeli troops shot and wounded three Palestinians during a clash at the police square.

September Members of "The Jewish Underground of Revenge" are arrested by the Israeli secret police.

September 22: Several thousand West Bank Jewish settlers and their supporters from Israel skirmished with Israeli border police for more than four hours before a group of religious Jews were able to brake into the Ibrahimi Mosque, which has been closed for 7 months after the massacre of 29 Muslims in February. At least four people were injured and 20 were arrested.

October 1: Israeli soldiers shot and killed a Palestinian man who stabbed and wounded an Israeli soldier.

October 7: Razi Haymouni, 23, a Palestinian was shot dead by Israeli border police after he tried to pour acid on two policemen near the Ibrahimi Mosque.

October 16: Israeli troops shot dead Imad al-Adarba, 23 in Hebron.

October 23: Nidal Said al-Tamimi, 22, was shot dead after he reportedly tried to stab a soldier. He had been recently released from an Israeli jail.

November 27: Rabbi Amiran Olami, 34, of Otniel was killed and an Israeli policeman wounded near Beit Hagai 10 km south of Hebron by shots fired from a passing car.

November 29: Israeli police arrested 10 Jewish settlers as they attempted to invade the Moslem-designated area in the Ibrahimi Mosque. Among those arrested was Yehuda Etzion, who was jailed for attempting to blow up the Dome of the Rock in East Jerusalem in 1984 and was granted amnesty after four years in jail.

1995

January 15: A shoulder-held anti-tank missile (LAW) was fired at a Jewish apartment in Hebron; 10 LAW missiles had been taken from an Israeli military base on the West Bank.

March 14: Four home-made bombs were found by Israeli police on a road at the northern entrance to Hebron.

March 19: Nahum Hoss, 31, of Hebron and Yehuda Fartush, 34, of Kiryat Arba, were killed and 6 settlers wounded when Palestinian gunmen fired on an Egged bus at a crossroads close to the Kiryat Arba settlement near the entrance to Hebron Several settlers then went on a "rampage" in Halhul village, near Hebron, shooting one Palestinian.

April 17: 3 Palestinians killed in IDF ambush.

June 4: A 13-year-old Palestinian boy was killed and his eight-year-old brother was wounded in Hebron when an Israeli army bomb exploded near their home.

June 29: Israeli special forces killed a senior member of Hamas movement in Hebron.

July 2: A 17-year-old Palestinian was killed by an Israeli soldier.

July 12: Settlers demonstrations against the expansion of self-rule in the West Bank led to clashes, Israeli police arrested 38 Israeli settlers who blocked the main road leading from Jerusalem to Hebron in the West Bank. The spokesman of the Council of Jewish settlers in the West Bank, said this was the opening salvo in a campaign of civil disobedience by the settlers to prevent the extension of Palestinian self-rule.

September 8: Five armed men in Israeli army uniforms, some of them masked, forced their way into private homes in Halhoul town 5 kilometres North of Hebron and interrogated the residents. During the assault they shot dead a young Palestinian man as his father watched. A Jewish extremist organization claimed responsibility for the attack.

September 9: Jewish settlers raided a Palestinian girls school and beat the schools headmistress also injured four pupils who had taken part in a street protest.

September 14: Hundreds of Palestinians clashed with Israeli troops, a Palestinian girl and a cameraman from the International Network were injured.

September 30: (Saturday) Yigal Amir (Yitzhak Rabin's assassin) was in a group of 20 Israeli who attacked Kathleen Kern and Wendy Lehman of Christian Peacemaker Team on Duboya Street while the women were filming. It was reported that the demonstrators were throwing stones, eggs and smashed the windows of 13 Palestinian cars and 5 houses.

October 13: The Israeli army closed three offices of the Palestinian Authority in Hebron including the offices of information, municipality and national solidarity, which were located next to Jewish settlers homes in the town.

1996

January 16, Sgt. Yaniv Shimel and Major Oz Tibon, both of Jerusalem, were killed when Palestinian gunmen fired on their car on the Hebron-Jerusalem road, reportedly in revenge for the assassination of Yehiya Ayyash.

March 22, The Israeli army arrested three Palestinians from Hebron believed to be involved in the suicide bombings in Israel.

April 2, More than 700 Palestinian marched through the city of Hebron protesting the Israeli closure of the West Bank and Gaza from February.

April 7 Two petrol bombs were thrown at an Israeli bus about 100 meters south of the entrance of Beit Omar near Hebron, injuring five Israelis.

1997

January 1, Hebron Market shot up by Israeli settler/soldier Noam Friedman, wounding seven Palestinians.

January 31 Israelis beat a Palestinian youth and detained him while he was trying to force his way into the Ibrahimi mosque. The incident set off further scuffles.

March 10 Israeli soldiers in Hebron beat Palestinians who tried to stop workers from opening a road for Jewish settlers through land claimed by the Palestinians.

March 21 -April 11, 3 weeks of protests throughout the West Bank demonstrating against the Israeli settlement construction at Jabal Abu Ghneim (Har Homa), Jerusalem. The protests in Hebron alone led to 2 Dead, Kamal al-Zaro, shot dead at a road block into H2 area and an Israeli settler shot dead Asem Arafeh, 24, a shopkeeper, with 276 injured in the clashes.

1998

Aug. 20, Rabbi Shlomo Ra'anan, 63, was stabbed to death in the bedroom of his caravan in Hebron

Oct. 26, Danny Vargas, 29, of Kiryat Arba was shot to death in Hebron.

1999

Jan. 13, Sergeant Yehoshua Gavriel, 25, of Ashdod, was killed when gunmen opened fire at the Othniel junction near Hebron.

August 8, After a shooting at 2 settlers in Hebron city centre the Hamas military wing, the ‘Iz al-Din al-Qassam Brigades released a statement taking responsibility.

2000

February 10: A Palestinian woman from the West Bank town of Hebron died of a heart attack after Israeli soldiers delayed her transfer to a hospital while they were searching her house. Hebron municipal sources said Fatimah Abu Rmeileh, 62, began feeling ill and her husband asked for an ambulance, while 10 soldiers sealed and searched their house. The Army said it found weapons and anti-Israeli propaganda during routine checks.

October 20: Jordanian citizen Walid J'afreh killed by IDF in Tarqumya, Hebron district

December 8: Palestinian militants opened fire on a car carrying four female teachers. One of them, Rina Didovsky, 39, was killed along with the driver, 41-year-old Eliyahu Ben Ami. Another woman was also injured.

On December 22: Muhammad Najib ‘Abido, killed by gunfire at Beit Hagai, near Hebron.

2001

February 1: Dr. Shmuel Gillis, 42, of Karmei Tzur, was killed by Palestinian gunmen who fired eleven times at his car near the Aroub refugee camp on the Jerusalem-Hebron highway.

March 10: Israeli resident Elad Pass, 18, was shot by a Palestinian in the Avraham Avino neighborhood.

March 26: Shalhevet Pass, age 10 months, was shot dead by member of the Tanzim militant group at the entrance to the Avraham Avinu neighborhood in Hebron. The murder shocked the Israeli public because the official investigation ruled that the Palestinian sniper had intentionally aimed for the baby.

July 19: Muhammad Helmi a-Tameizi along with Diaa' Marwan a-Tameizi Under 1 year-old and Muhammad Salameh a-Tameizi was shot dead by settlers while driving by Idhna, Hebron district.

2002

March 27: Two Temporary International Presence in Hebron observers were killed by Palestinian gunmen in a shooting attack on the road to Hebron, Cengiz Soytunc (Turkish) and Catherine Berruex (Swiss).

April: During Operation Defensive Shield, the IDF took control of the whole city and set up permanent guard towers in H-1. The official TIPH Internet site notes: "Since then, the Israeli army operates over the entire area in violation of the agreements."

April: Israeli raid on the West Bank city of Hebron. A least 1 Palestinian was killed early in the raid and then, at an Israeli checkpoint, a Palestinian policeman was killed and four others wounded.

July 28: 14-year-old Nivin Jamjum was shot dead in Hebron, when settlers rioted in Hebron.

November 15: 12 Israelis were killed in an ambush of Israeli security personnel in the Wadi an-Nasara neighborhood of Hebron. Of the 12, four were IDF soldiers, five Border Police, and three were from the Kiryat Arba Emergency Response Team. Several high-ranking officers, among them Hebron Brigade commander Colonel Dror Weinberg, were killed. The three Palestinian gunmen were also killed in a 90-minute firefight.

November 16: Israeli forces re-entered H1 areas, carrying out mass arrests (40) and demolishing four houses.

November 26: there are conflicting reports about the death of a four-year-old Palestinian child. IDF reports said the child had been hit by splinters from a hand grenade thrown at soldiers by Palestinian youths.

2003

March 9: Rabbi Eli Horowitz, 52, and his wife Dina, 50, were killed in their home while celebrating the Sabbath. Five other Israelis were injured. Hamas claimed responsibility.

May 17: a pregnant Israeli woman and her husband were killed when a suicide bomber detonated his charge next to them in a public square in Hebron. Hamas claimed responsibility.

September 9: Thaer Monsur Noman al-Sayouri, aged 9, was killed by IDF tank fire to his head while in his home during an incursion in Hebron.

September 26: Eyal Yeberbaum, 27, and 7-month old infant Shaked Avraham were shot dead by a Palestinian who knocked on the door of a home in Negohot, 9 km west of Hebron, during a celebratory Rosh Hashana (Jewish New Year holiday) dinner. Islamic Jihad took responsibility for the attack.

In 2003 a company of Israeli border police was disbanded after an incident gained international notoriety. Two border policemen beat a Palestinian and threw him from the back of their jeep, traveling at approximately 80 km/h, to celebrate the end of their tour of duty. In 2008 four Israeli border guards involved in the incident were belatedly convicted of the offences of falsifying records, robbery, abduction and the killing of Amran Abu Hamatiya.

2004

March 10, Thaer Mohammad Harun Eid al-Halika, 15, of Shioukh al-Aroob, near Hebron, was killed by IDF gunfire to his back at close range on his way home near Route 60.

April 25, The Al-Aqsa Martyrs Brigades claimed responsibility for the attack in which border policeman Cpl. Yaniv Mashiah, 20, of Jaffa was killed and three others were slightly wounded an hour after the beginning of Memorial Day for Israel's fallen soldiers, when shots were fired at their vehicle near Hebron.

September 29, A group of five Israeli settlers attacked and seriously wounded two U.S. citizens, members of an NGO, who were escorting Palestinian children to school near Hebron.

2005

January 6, Hamzah Abdul-Minem Jaber, nine years old, was killed by an IDF jeep on the main road near his home in Hebron.

February 14, after being beaten Sabri Fayez Younis al-Rjoub, 17, of Dura, near Hebron was killed by IDF gunfire to his chest, abdomen, pelvis and right leg.

21 May In Hebron, 10s of Jewish settlers attack Palestinian homes to protest a solidarity visit to the Palestinians by several Israeli peace activists; Jewish settlers from Beit Hadasah settlement, chase and throw stones, eggs, tomatoes at Palestinian girls at a nearby elementary school.

26 May IDF soldiers break into, occupy a Palestinian home in Hebron to watch a soccer championship on the family's satellite TV. the IDF confirms the incident took place, says the cmdr. of the squad has been suspended.

29 May The IDF fatally shoots a Palestinian with a hearing problem who fails orders to halt near Hebron's Ibrahimi Mosque/Tomb of the Patriarchs.

2006

January 14, The TIPH said dozens of Israeli settler youths attacked five of its members, mostly US citizens, near the "Beit Hadassah" settlement. The workers were slightly injured, and two required medical treatment. Police informed the organization that it would be required to leave the area by 22 January, as all Jewish sections of the city would be closed as a military zone. Israeli security forces were able to suspend the military closure on Jewish areas of Hebron, removed roadblocks at the entrances to settlements and eased identity checks when most of the non-residents, who entered Hebron to support the rioting settlers left.

January 17, Amidst protests against an Israeli order to evict nine Jewish families squatting in an area taken from Palestinians in Hebron after the start of the intifada, Israeli police forcibly removed a handful of settler youths from the squat to try to end days of unrest. Late the previous day, the military had declared the area "a closed military zone" to non-residents.

January 18, Olmert ordered the IDF to immediately remove nine Jewish families (some 50 people) squatting illegally on a Palestinian fruit and vegetable market in Hebron. The decision followed consultations with security officials and the new Foreign Minister, Tzipi Livni, who is also Justice Minister. The settlers have so far rejected the proposal. Five settlers there were arrested by security forces.

January 19, Israeli troops had shot dead a Palestinian teenager near Hebron IDF and witnesses said he was trying to throw a fire bomb at an IDF patrol near one of the settlements.

2007

On January 21, Jewish settler Yifat Alkobi pressed her face while repeatedly hissing "sharmuta" at her married Palestinian neighbour, Abu Ayesha. A video of settler abusing Palestinians in Hebron received International media attention and her actions widely condemned.

And where, according to testimony given by Taysir Abu Ayesha, Baruch Marzel broke into the house with 10 other settlers in the winter of 2002, beat him and attempted to drag him into the road before he was rescued by his stick-brandishing father.

March Israeli settlers escorted in the 'House of Contention'

June 8, Hijazi Muhammad Abdul-Aziz Rzaiqat, 17, of Taffouh, near Hebron, shot to death by IDF gunfire to his chest, abdomen, left shoulder and right thigh while hunting birds with a gun.

On July 3, Ahmad Abdul-Muhsen Abdul-Rahim al-Skafi, 15, of Hebron, was killed by IDF gunfire to his head while carrying a toy gun.

August Hillel Weiss, father of Tehila Yahalom, verbally abused Hebron Brigade commander Col. Yehuda Fox, while IDF troops evacuated two settler families from the Hebron wholesale market. Bar-Ilan University, where Weiss is a professor, has publicly distanced itself from his remarks and criticized Weiss.

2008

On February 13, the 15-month prison sentence and reduction to the rank of private of Lieutenant Ya'akov Gigi was confirmed for a "wild rampage" in the West Bank where Gigi and five of his soldiers hijacked a Palestinian taxi in July 2007 in the West Bank village of Dahariya, near Hebron. The version of events that Gigi gave was found to be false. First Sergeant Dror, who shot a Palestinian in the neck, severely wounding him, claims that the way the Palestinian looked at him was enough to classify him as a "suspect" and to justify opening fire.

In February, the IDF ordered an orphanage run by the Islamic Charitable Society (ICS), that houses 240 orphans in Hebron, closed, based on the ICS's alleged promotion of 'terrorism'. The ICS disputes these charges.

May 2, Khalil Ahmad Mahmoud a-Za'arir was killed after attempting to stab a soldier at a Hebron checkpoint.

July 9, Avner Inbar, an Israeli, taking a group of South African Human rights activists, that included Zackie Achmat and Edwin Cameronon, on a tour of Hebron reported that the group was verbally abused by settlers. Three Israelis were arrested for disturbing the peace.

August, al-Ras Mosque, located next to al-Rajabi House settlement became the target of settler attacks during early August 2008 with large quantities of rubbish were placed at the entrance of the Mosque and was again attacked on August 11, 2008 when Israeli settlers from the al-Rajabi House settlement attempted to set fire to the mosque.

During the second week of August a total of five civilians – three Palestinians and two foreigners, including two UNRWA staff and one child, were physically assaulted and injured.

7 August Israeli settlers from Giv'at Ha'avot settlement (next to Kiryat Arba) attacked five nearby Palestinian houses with rocks and bottles.

August Hebron settlers attacked a group of visiting UK diplomats. Breaking the Silence only take small parties so as not to constitute a "group" as settlers regularly attacked "Breaking the Silence" tours.

October 25 Settlers destroyed Muslim graves and 80 Palestinian cars during a riot against the IDF, as the army dismantled a new settlement near Hebron.

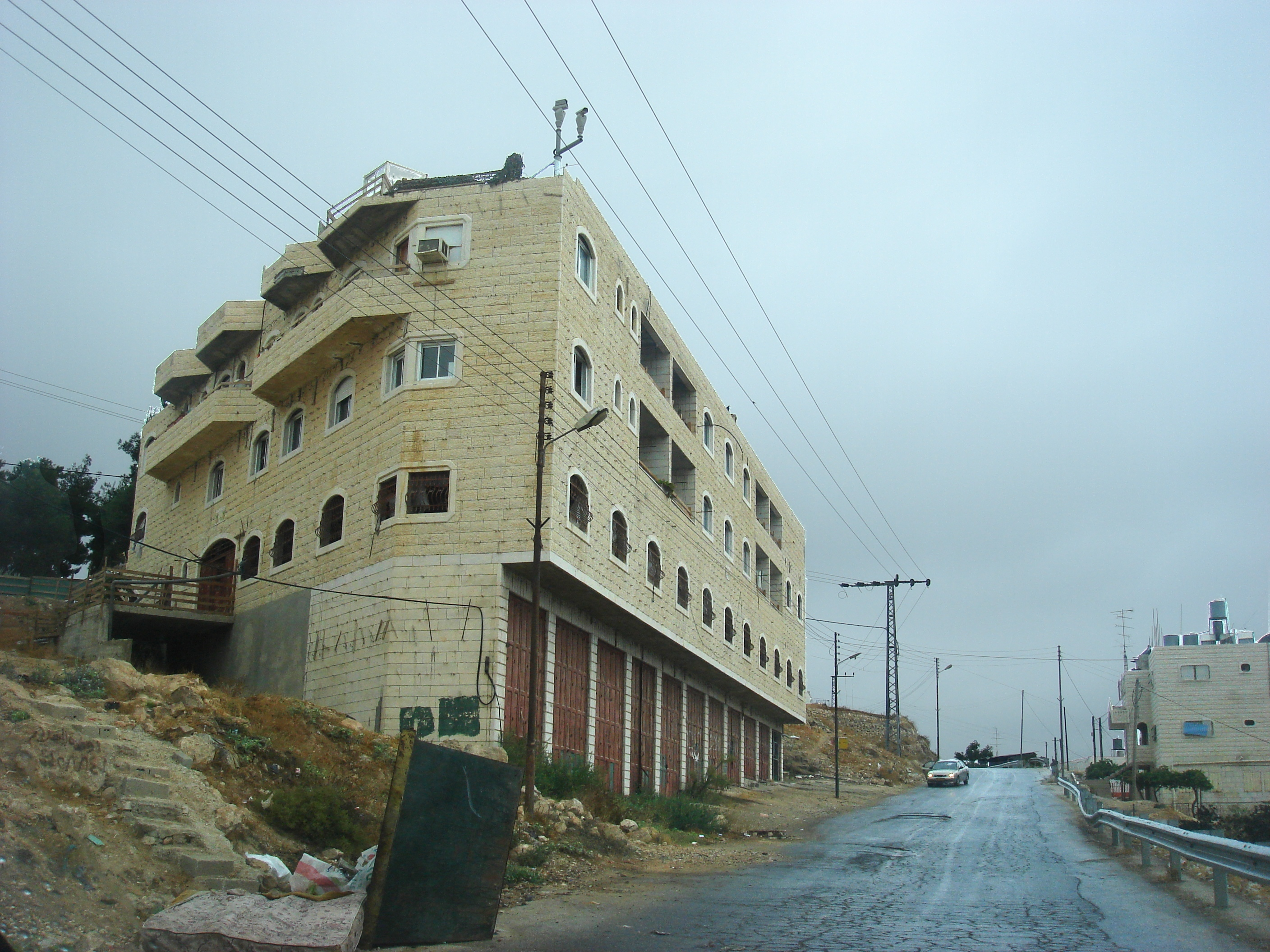
Beit HaShalom, September 2008

On 6 December, Israelis from the House of Contention, also called the House of Peace, are evicted by Israeli police after the Palestinian they purchased it from claimed that it had been "stolen".

The settlers at the Hebron house – called the House of Peace by settlers but the House of Contention by the media – claimed they had bought the building legally two years ago from a Palestinian. The Palestinian has denied selling the building to the settlers, and last month the Israeli supreme court said the house should be evacuated until the ownership dispute was settled.

On 7 December, in the aftermath of the evacuation, Israelis and Palestinians clashed. As a result, 35 Israelis and 17 Palestinians were injured. An Israeli soldier, Corporal Avraham Schneider of the elite Givati Brigade and settler from Kiryat Arba, was arrested for firing a gun in the air during the riots. The incident was characterized as "a pogrom" by then Israeli Prime Minister Ehud Olmert, who said he was ashamed "as a Jew". Four years later, the court ruled in favor of the Israelis in the dispute over the building after they provided a video of the Palestinian who had claimed it was stolen counting the money he had received for it.

2010

In February 2010, in an incident compared to the Tapuah junction stabbing, one of a group of militants who were throwing rocks at a Jewish home attempted to stab one of the soldiers who arrived to stop them.

In the June 2010 IDF Tik Tok incident there was an international media flap when a group of Israeli soldiers was filmed dancing in the streets of Hebron to "Tik Tok" by Kesha while on patrol in full combat gear.

In August, Hamas militants killed four Israelis in a drive-by shooting: Yitzhak Ames, Tali Ames, Kochava Even Chaim, and Avishai Shindler. Tali Ames was nine months pregnant when she was killed. Hamas hailed the killings as "heroic" and promised the kill more Israelis living in the West Bank.

2011

In October, Israeli resident Asher Palmer, 25, and his infant son Yonatan were killed in a Palestinian stone-throwing attack. Another Palestinian who witnessed the attack stole Asher's wallet and handgun.

2012

In July, three Israeli children were injured when Palestinians from Casbah threw stones at a playground in the Avraham Avinu neighborhood. One of the victims was the 10-year-old sister of Shalhevet Pass, who was shot dead as an infant by a Palestinian sniper in 2001.

That same month, a 60-year-old Israeli man was attacked with a boulder by a Palestinian while bathing in the Abraham spring at Tel Rumeida in what was called an attempted murder. He was hospitalized in moderate condition. The site, which is thought to be over 3,000 years old, is regarded as holy by the Jews.

In September, the court ruled in favor of Israelis who had been expelled from their home four years earlier after a Palestinian they had purchased it from claimed that it had been "stolen". The Israelis had provided a film of him receiving the money paid for the building.

In December, a 17-year-old Palestinian was shot at a checkpoint by a female soldier. The soldier was later awarded a certificate of merit, as it had been believed that the boy had attempted to carry out a terror attack. Palestinians rioted afterwards, and his father, trying to get in the ambulance with him, was allegedly hit by soldiers and had to be hospitalized. There are conflicting accounts surrounding the details of the shooting. According to testimony collected by B'tselem, the boy was asked to approach the border policeman who discovered a toy gun. The toy gun was confiscated and a fight broke out with the boy attempting to get it back. He was shot and killed during that struggle. The IDF reported that the boy attacked the officers and that they acted properly in response. It was also reported that the boy had pulled out the toy gun after being asked to identify himself and that the soldier had believed the gun to be real at the time.

2016

In March, the Hebron Shooting Incident occurred in which Abdel Fattah al-Sharif was shot by a male soldier.

=== 2026 ===
On 10 of January Israeli forces shot and killed a Palestinian man who was driving with his daughter and three grandchildren in Hebron’s H2 area. Israeli forces initially alleged that he had attempted to ram soldiers with his vehicle but later stated that no evidence indicated an intentional attack . Medical teams were reportedly prevented from providing assistance. The body was returned to the family for burial on 12 January, and the four passengers were treated at a hospital for psychological trauma.In 19 January, approximately 25,000 residents of Hebron’s H2 area have been placed under curfew and strict movement restrictions as part of a large-scale Israeli operation, disrupting access to food, healthcare, and schools.

On October 23, two Hebron residents shot two Israeli soldiers to death at a checkpoint. In response, the Israel Defense Forces carried out an 11-day operation, which included demolishing illegal buildings in the vicinity of the checkpoint and raiding the neighborhood where the gunmen lived.

== See also ==
- Al-Shuhada Street
- Worshippers Way
- Israeli–Palestinian conflict
- Timeline of the Israeli–Palestinian conflict
- Media coverage of the Arab–Israeli conflict

== Bibliography ==
- Burkett, Elinor Golda Meir: The Iron Lady of the Middle East ISBN 978-1-906142-13-1
- Gorenberg, Gershom The Accidental Empire: Israel and the Birth of the Settlements, 1967–1977, Times Books, Henry Holt & Co., New York 2007 ISBN 978-0-8050-8241-8
- Zachary Lockman, Joel Beinin (1989) Intifada: The Palestinian Uprising Against Israeli Occupation South End Press, ISBN 0-89608-363-2 and ISBN 978-0-89608-363-9
- Brown, Cynthia G. (Human Rights Watch) and Karim, Farhad (Human Rights Watch) (1995) Playing the "communal Card": Communal Violence and Human Rights Human Rights Watch, ISBN 1-56432-152-5 and ISBN 978-1-56432-152-7
