= Temporary International Presence in Hebron =

Civilian observer mission in the West Bank, 1994-2019

- Abbreviation: TIPH
- Formation: 1994
- Dissolved: 2019

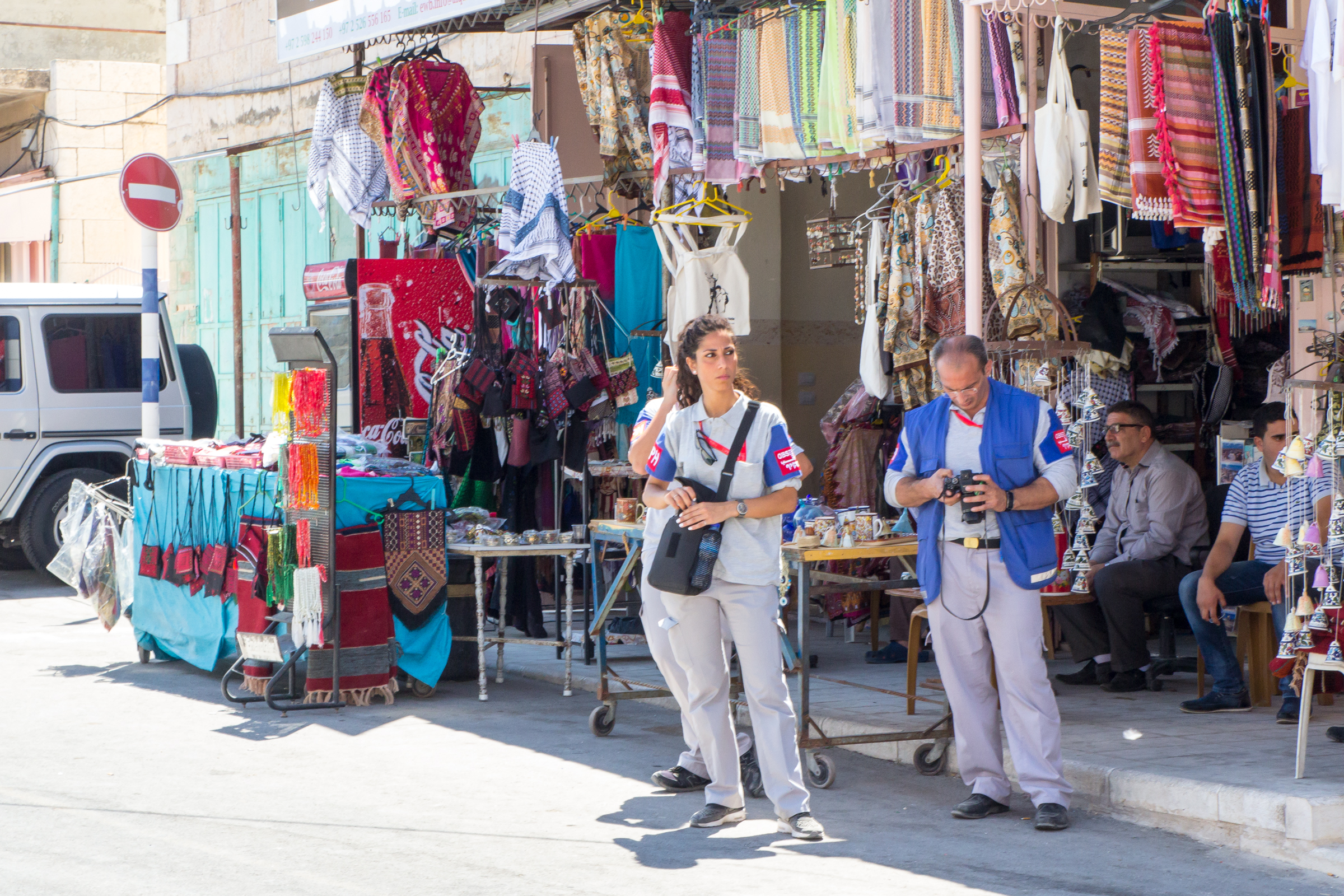
TIPH observers in Hebron, August 2015

Temporary International Presence in Hebron (TIPH) was a civilian observer mission in the West Bank city of Hebron established in 1994. Both the Israeli government and the Palestinian Authority called for its creation. It “monitor[ed] the situation in Hebron and record[ed] breaches of international humanitarian law, the agreements on Hebron between Israel and the Palestinian authority and human rights, in accordance with internationally recognized standards". It also monitored Israeli settlers, and aimed to help the Arab Palestinians who lived there. It was staffed by personnel from Italy, Norway, Sweden, Switzerland and Turkey.

In 2019, the Israeli government declined to renew TIPH's mandate, effectively expelling the mission.

== Establishment ==
The TIPH mission was first established in 1994 after the Cave of the Patriarchs massacre on 25 February 1994, in which 29 Palestinians were killed. On 18 March, the UN Security Council condemned the massacre in United Nations Security Council Resolution 904, and called for a temporary international presence in Hebron. On 31 March, representatives of the Palestinian Liberation Organization and the Israeli government signed an agreement requesting Italy, Denmark and Norway to provide observers to form a Temporary International Presence in the City of Hebron (TIPH). The first TIPH mission operated from 8 May to 8 August 1994. However, the Palestinian Authority and the Israeli government could not reach an agreement on the extension of the mandate, and the observers were therefore withdrawn on 8 August.

Peace negotiations between the Palestinian Liberation Organization and the Israeli Government resulted in the signing of the Oslo II Accord on 28 September 1995. It called for partial redeployment of the Israeli Defense Forces from the West Bank including Area H-1 in Hebron. It also called for the creation of another Temporary International Presence in Hebron.

On 12 May 1996, a temporary second TIPH mission observers started, this time with only Norwegian members.

After the IDF's partial redeployment from Hebron, the parties signed the Protocol Concerning the Redeployment in Hebron on 17 January 1997, and four days later The Agreement on the Temporary International Presence in the City of Hebron. The third mission, started on 1 February 1997, included observers from Norway, Italy, Denmark, Sweden, Switzerland and Turkey. The agreement set a three-month mandate, renewable for a period of three months. Since then the mission has been reinforced with staff from those six countries with Norway as the coordinator.

== Purpose of the TIPH ==
According to its mandate, the purpose of the TIPH was:

1. to promote by their presence a feeling of security to the Palestinians of Hebron;
2. to help promote stability and an appropriate environment conducive to the enhancement of the well-being of the Palestinians of Hebron and their economic development;
3. to observe the enhancement of peace and prosperity among Palestinians;
4. to assist in the promotion and execution of projects initiated by the donor countries;
5. to encourage economic development and growth in Hebron;
6. to provide reports as set out in paragraph 7 [of the Agreement on the Temporary international Presence in the City of Hebron]; and
7. to coordinate its activities with the Israeli and Palestinian authorities.

== Activities ==
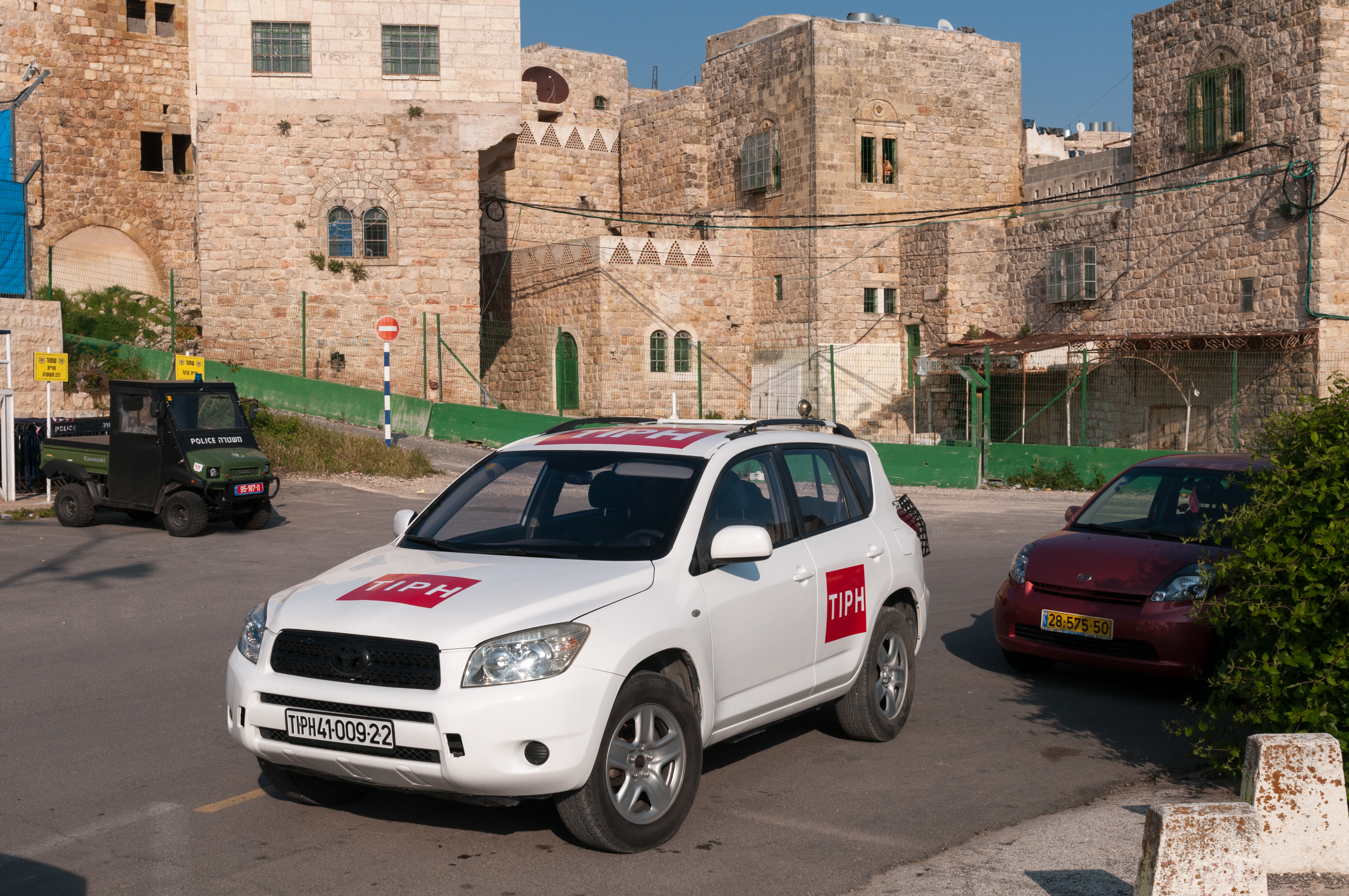
A vehicle belonging to the TIPH

Members of the TIPH served as observers and were not permitted to interfere in disputes or incidents. Instead, they reported incidents to the Head of Mission of the TIPH. They had no military or police functions. The members of the TIPH voluntarily opted to be an unarmed mission.

Reports of the TIPH on breaches of international humanitarian law, agreements on Hebron and human rights were not made public. They were available to the Israeli Defense Forces, the Palestinian Police Forces, and the member states. Specifically the reports looked for:

- Damages to private property caused by IDF or settlers.
- Prolonged ID checks or verbal and physical harassments by IDF personnel.
- Other breaches of international human rights standards.
- Breaches of rules applicable to Hebron, such as the Interim Agreement or Hebron Protocol.

Incident reports were analysed twice weekly by the TIPH Report Assessment Group (RAG), which tried to identify patterns.

In addition to observing and creating reports, the TIPH also worked on community relations projects to fulfill its mandate. The projects worked to “promote a feeling of security” and “contribute to economic development” in Hebron.

== TIPH as a peacekeeping force ==
One of the differentiating factors between the TIPH and most other peacekeeping forces was that it operated as a bilateral agreement reached by two conflicting parties. Furthermore, it did not have a UN mandate, and instead it was an “intergovernmental organization set up with the sole purpose to perform its mandate, which is based on a bilateral agreement signed by the Israelis and Palestinians.” The advantage of this arrangement was that without being linked to any external organizations, the TIPH served only to perform its mandate. It operated outside any perceived bias international organizations may have had.

=== Criticisms ===
Karin Aggestam, who served with TIPH in 2000, distinguishes between "neutrality" and "impartiality". According to Aggestam, TIPH is not expected to be neutral, since its mandate is to monitor the welfare of the Palestinian residents of Hebron in recognition of “the existing asymmetry between Israelis and Palestinians." Israeli authorities and particularly Israeli settlers, who have never accepted TIPH's presence, have frequently accused TIPH of having a Palestinian bias. The Palestinian civilian population often feel frustrated at TIPH's practice of observing rather than actively intervening. According to Aggestam the settler population considers TIPH observers to have pre-conceived notions, possibly antisemitic, and often compare TIPH members to Nazi soldiers; as a result, Aggestam says that TIPH members are often subject to verbal and physical harassment, by settler youth in particular, with the IDF looking on passively. Aggestam judges that TIPH "strives towards an impartial and balanced practice to implement the goals stipulated in the mandate."

According to Aggestam, while the mandate of the TIPH, namely normalization of civil and economic life in Hebron, is a long-term aspiration, it was created as a temporary body with a mandate to be renewed every three months. In addition its members rotate every six to eighteen months. This leads to “inadequate planning and a lack of institutional memory.”

== Incidents ==
On 26 March 2002 two observers, Catherine Berruex and Turgut Cengiz Toytunç were killed, and another observer wounded after their car was shot on a road near Halhul. The wounded observer said the shooter was dressed in a Palestinian police uniform and that he kept shooting after the observers told him they were from TIPH. The TIPH car was marked with large orange TIPH stickers, a marking well known to the area's residents. An Israeli military court found a Palestinian man guilty of the murders, in September, 2003. Israeli authorities said that three people were involved in the killing.

In February 2006, TIPH staffers fled and evacuated their offices following an attack by hundreds of Palestinians high school children who threw rocks and broke car windows. The attackers shouted their opposition to the publication of Muhammad cartoons in Denmark and Norway. TIPH members began to resume their duties in April 2006.

== Calls for removal ==
In July 2017, a TIPH employee punctured the tires of a car owned by a Jewish family. The incident, which was caught on film, shows a TIPH marked vehicle arriving at the scene and man wearing a TIPH vest crouching near the tire as two other men from the vehicle stand watch. According to the Israeli foreign ministry, TIPH head Einar Johnsen expressed his regrets for the incident and said that "TIPH monitors that were involved in inappropriate activity were immediately sent back to the countries".

In July 2018, the legal counsel of the TIPH was filmed slapping a 10-year-old Jewish boy across the face. After the footage was released, the TIPH member was ordered to leave Israel. The Swiss ambassador to Israel apologized for the actions of the observer.

In November 2018, following complaints alleging TIPH members are involved in the systematic violent targeting of the Jewish community, the Israeli foreign ministry said that a preliminary review determined that TIPH has "outlived its usefulness". Dore Gold, Tzipi Hotovely, and Land of Israel Knesset caucus advocated the removal of TIPH, while left wing groups and B’Tselem have called for its retention.

On January 28, 2019, Israeli Prime Minister Benjamin Netanyahu tweeted that he has decided not to extend TIPH's mandate, which effectively resulted in the removal of TIPH from the region. Netanyahu justified his decision by saying that Israel "will not allow the continued presence of an international force that operates against us."

Norway's Foreign Minister, Ine Marie Eriksen Søreide warned that withdrawing TIPH may violate the Oslo Accords, and the Palestinian National Authority asked for the UN to “guarantee the safety and protection of the people of Palestine”.

== Twentieth anniversary report ==
The TIPH issued a confidential report covering their 20 years of observing the situation in Hebron. The report, based in part on over 40,000 incident reports over those 20 years, found that Israel routinely violates international law in Hebron and that it is in "severe and regular breach" of the rights to non-discrimination laid out in the International Covenant on Civil and Political Rights over the lack of freedom to movement for the Palestinian residents of Hebron. The report found that Israel is in regular violation of Article 49 of the Fourth Geneva Convention which prohibits the deportation of civilians from occupied territory. The report also found the presence of any Israeli settlement in Hebron to violate international law.

== See also ==
- Protocol Concerning the Redeployment in Hebron

== External links and references ==
- Official website
- Jewish Virtual Library: History of the TIPH
