= Hebron =

City in the West Bank, Palestine

Hebron الخليل
- Metropolis

Arabic transcription(s)
  - Arabic: الخليل
  - Latin: Al-Khalīl (official); Al-Ḫalīl (unofficial)

Hebrew transcription(s)
  - Hebrew: חברון
  - Latin: Ḥeḇrōn (ISO 259-3)
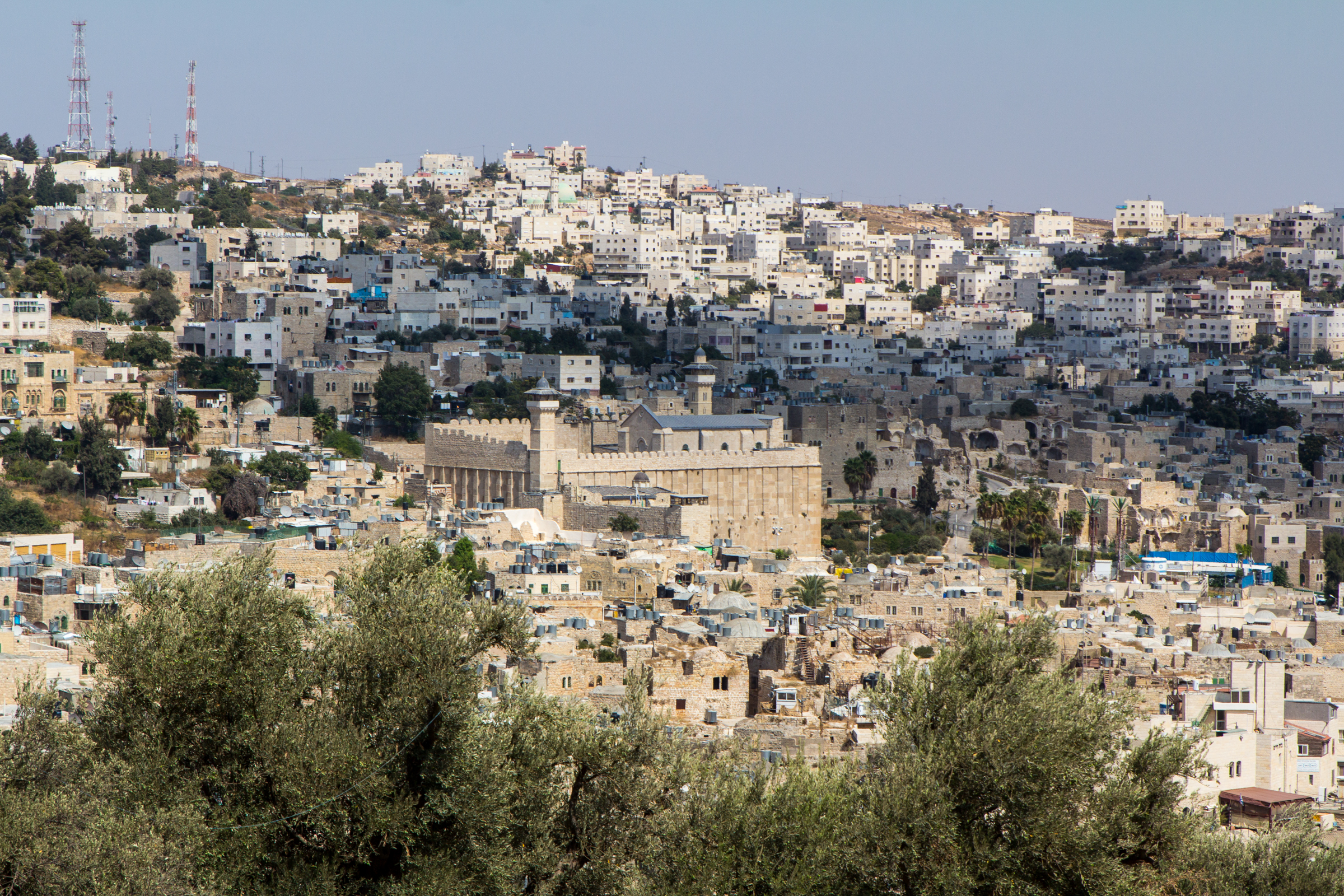
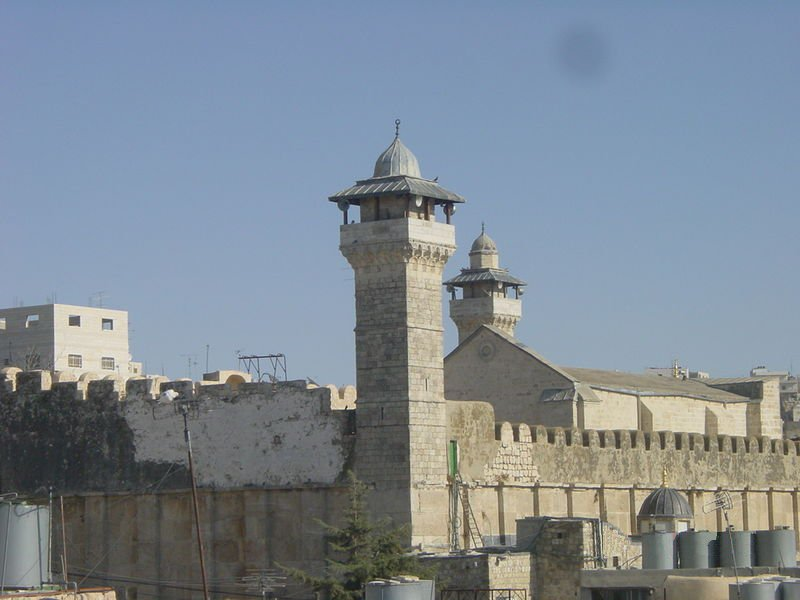
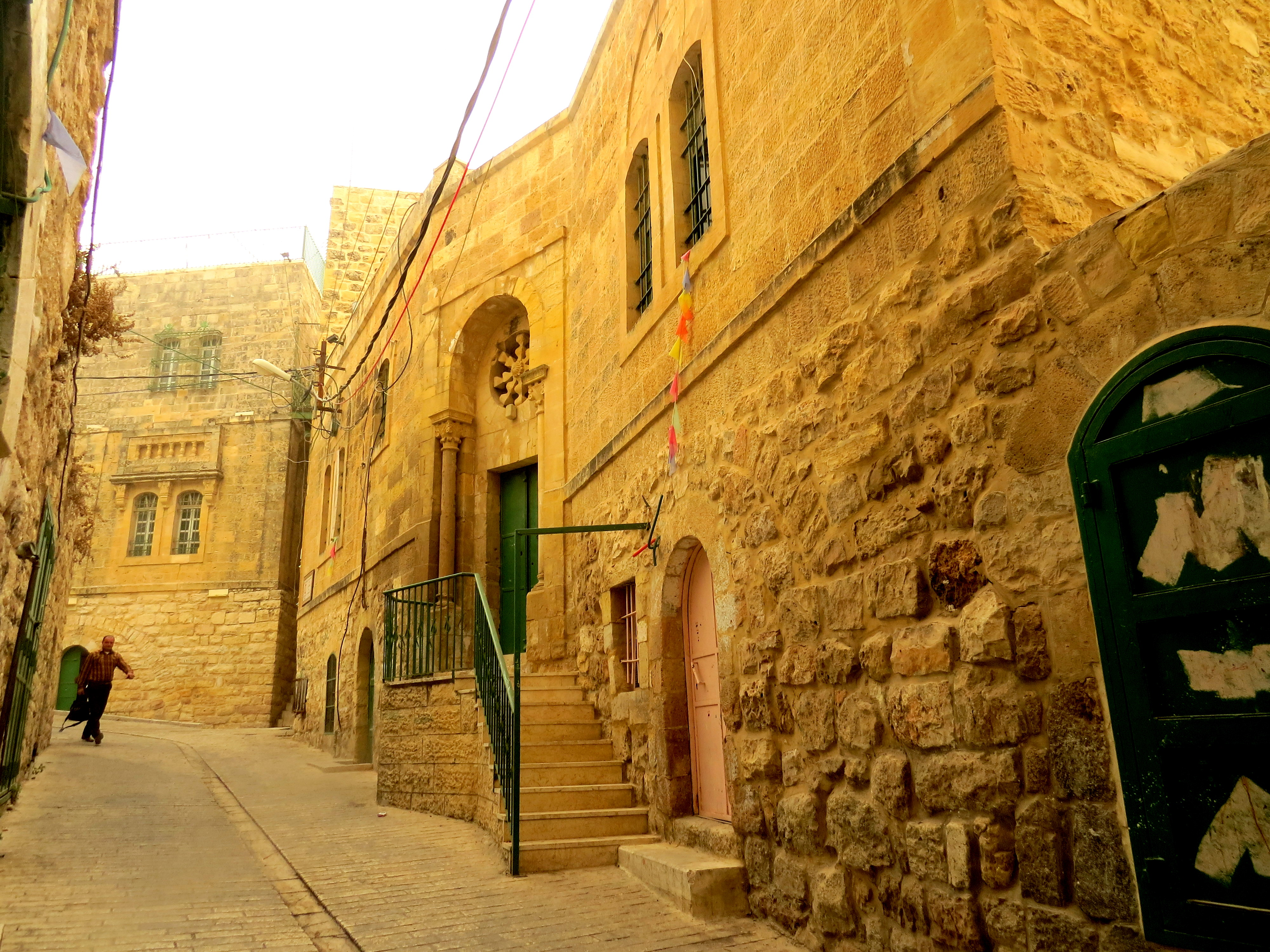
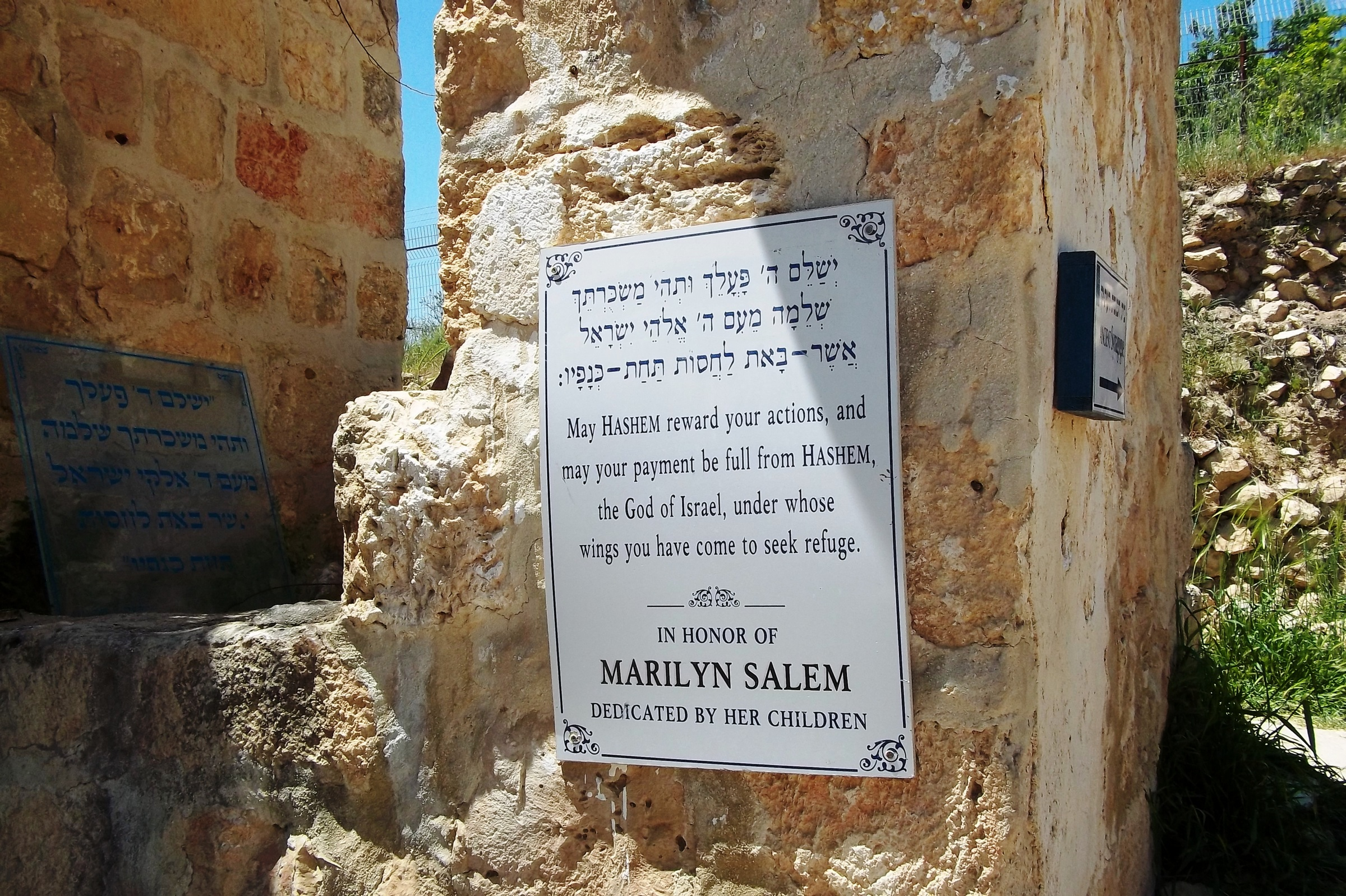
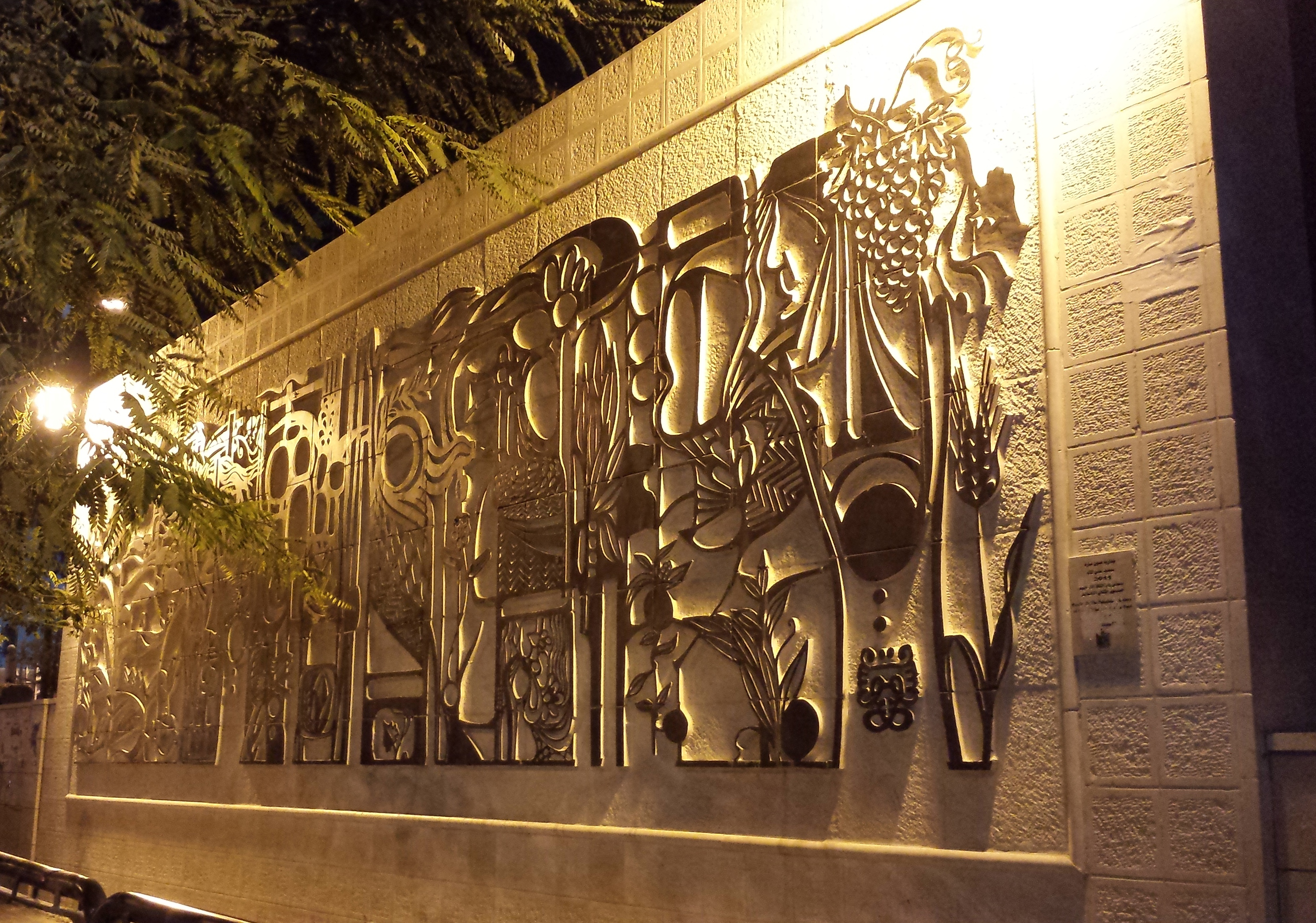
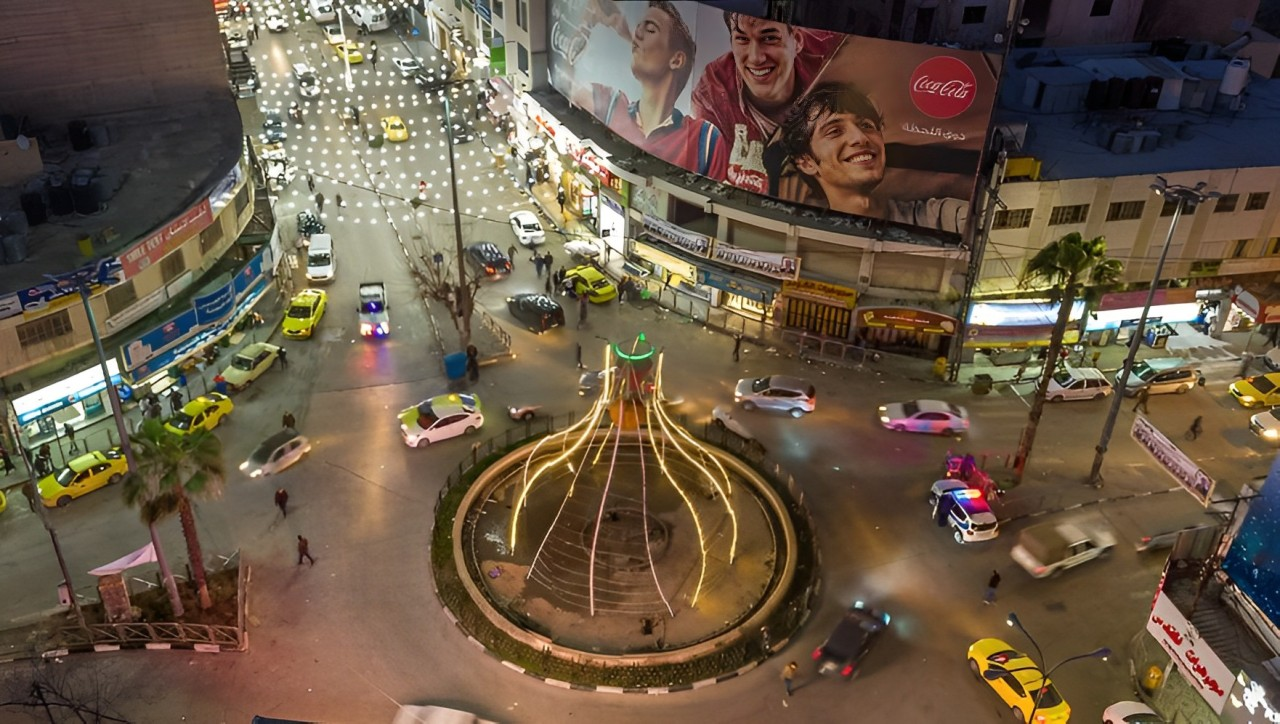
- (Top to bottom, left to right) View of Hebron with the Abraham Mosque (Cave of the Patriarchs), the Cave of the Patriarchs up close, Old City of Hebron, Tomb of Jesse and Ruth, an artwork on a wall in the city, and Downtown Hebron

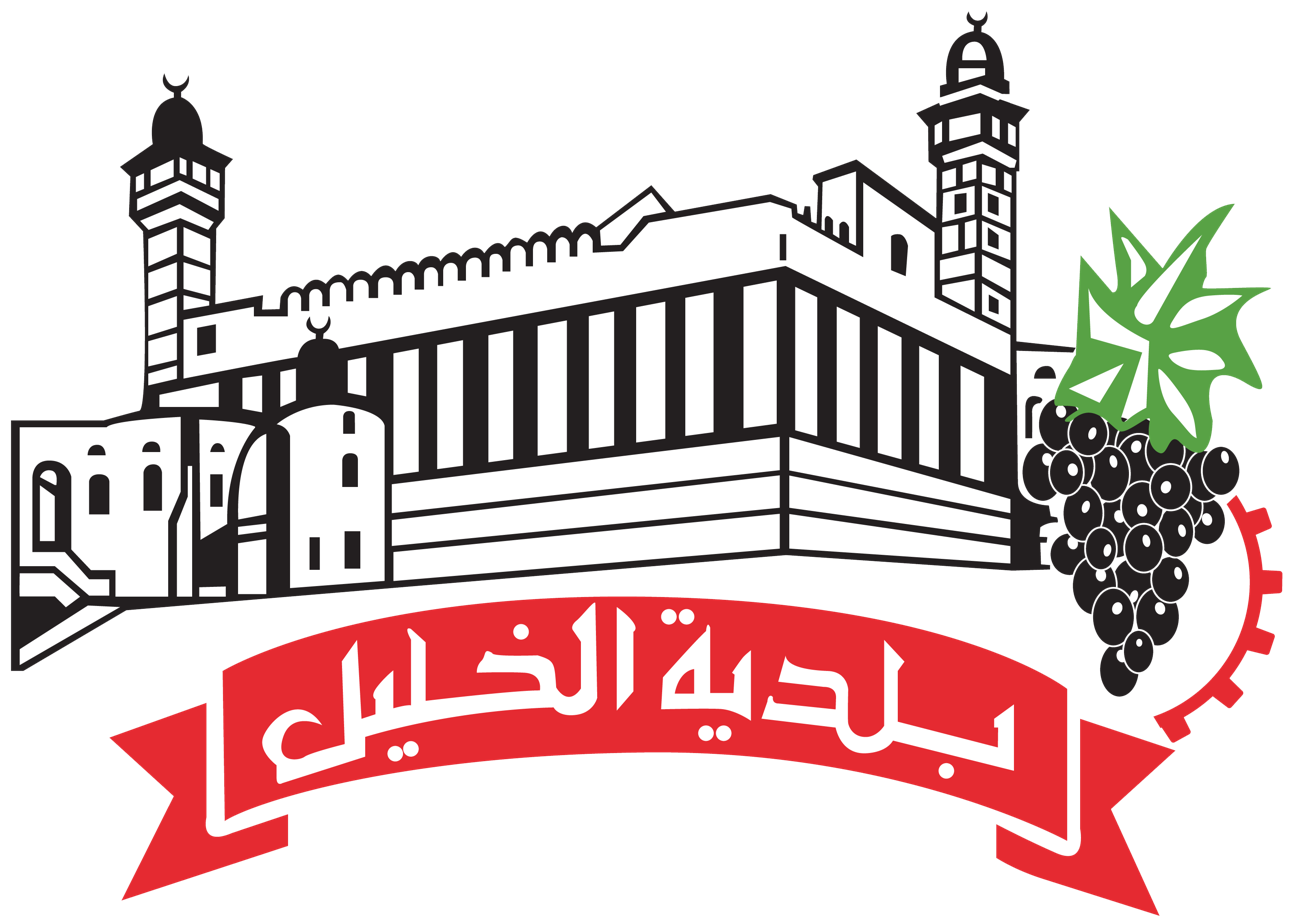
- Municipal Seal of Hebron
- Nickname: City of the Patriarchs
- Interactive map of Hebron
- Location of Hebron within Palestine
- Coordinates: 31°31′43″N 35°05′49″E
- Palestine grid: 159/103
- State: Palestine (civil governance); Israel (H2 area military control)
- Governorate: Hebron

Government
  - Type: City / Municipality type A (from 1997)
  - Head of Municipality: Yousef Al-Jabari

Area
  - Metropolis: 74.102 km^{2} (28.611 sq mi)

Population (2017)
  - Metropolis: 201,063
  - Density: 2,713.3/km^{2} (7,027.5/sq mi)
  - Metro: 700,000
- Website: www.hebron-city.ps

UNESCO World Heritage Site
- Official name: Hebron/Al-Khalil Old Town
- Criteria: Cultural: ii, iv, vi
- Reference: 1565
- Inscription: 2017 (41st Session)
- Endangered: 2017–
- Area: 20.6 ha (51 acres)
- Buffer zone: 152.2 ha (376 acres)

Hebron (Note: /ˈhiːbrən, ˈhɛbrən, ˈhiːbrɒn, ˈhɛbrɒn/ HEE-brən, HEB-rən, HEE-bron, HEB-ron; Arabic: الخليل, romanized: al-Khalīl, or خَلِيل الرَّحْمَن, Khalīl al-Raḥmān; Hebrew: חֶבְרוֹן, romanized: Ḥeḇrōn.) is a city in the southern West Bank, Palestine, and the capital of the Hebron Governorate, which is the largest in the West Bank. It is located 30 kilometers (19 mi) south of Jerusalem. The population inside in the city limits is 201,063, while the adjacent metropolitan area within the governorate is home to over 700,000 people. Hebron spans across an area of 74.1 square kilometers (28.6 sq mi). It is the third largest city in the country after Gaza and East Jerusalem. Hebron is often considered one of the Four Holy Cities in Judaism. It is also venerated in Christianity and Islam.

It is one of the oldest continuously inhabited cities in the Levant. According to the Bible, Abraham settled in Hebron and bought the Cave of the Patriarchs as a burial place for his wife Sarah. Biblical tradition holds that the patriarchs Abraham, Isaac, and Jacob, along with their wives Sarah, Rebecca, and Leah, were buried in the cave. The city is also recognized in the Bible as the place where David was anointed king of Israel. Following the Babylonian captivity, the Edomites settled in Hebron. The settlement was destroyed, probably during the Hasmonean conquest of Idumaea in the late 2nd century BCE. The following period shows a Jewish material culture, which may reflect either Jewish settlers or Judaized Edomites. During the 1st century BCE, Herod the Great built the wall that still surrounds the Cave of the Patriarchs, which later became a church, and then a mosque. With the exception of a brief Crusader control, successive Muslim dynasties ruled Hebron from the 7th century CE until the Ottoman Empire's dissolution following World War I, when the city became part of British Mandatory Palestine.

The 1929 Hebron massacre of nearly 70 Jews and the Arab uprising of 1936–39 led the British government to evacuate the Jewish community from Hebron. The 1948 Arab–Israeli War saw the entire West Bank, including Hebron, occupied and annexed by Jordan, and since the 1967 Six-Day War, the city has been under Israeli control. Following Israeli occupation, Jewish presence was restored in the city. Since the 1997 Hebron Protocol, most of Hebron has been governed by the Palestinian National Authority. The city is often described as a "microcosm" of the Israeli–Palestinian conflict and the Israeli occupation of the West Bank. The 1997 protocol divided the city into two sectors—H1 Hebron, governed by the Palestinian National Authority, and H2 Hebron, occupied by Israeli authorities. All security arrangements and travel permits for local residents are coordinated between the Palestinian Authority and Israel via the COGAT. The Jewish settlers have their own governing municipal body, the Committee of the Jewish Community of Hebron.

The largest city in the southern West Bank, Hebron is a chief commercial and industrial center in the region. It is a busy hub of trade, generating roughly a third of the area's GDP, largely due to the sale of limestone from quarries in its area. Hebron has a local reputation for its grapes, figs, ceramics, plastics, pottery workshops, metalworking and glassblowing industry. The city is home to numerous shopping malls. The Old City of Hebron features narrow, winding streets, flat-roofed stone houses, and old bazaars. It is recognized as a World Heritage Site by the UNESCO. Hebron is also known as a regional educational and medical hub.

== Etymology ==
The name Hebron appears to trace back to two northwest Semitic languages, which coalesce in the form ḥbr, (Note: Y.L. Arbeitman, The Hittite is Thy Mother: An Anatolian Approach to Genesis 23, (1981) pp. 889-1026, argues that an Indo-European root *ar-, with the same meaning as the semitic root ḥbr, namely 'to join' may underlie part of the earlier name Kiryat-Arba.) having reflexes in Hebrew and Amorite, with a basic sense of 'unite' and connoting a range of meanings from 'colleague' to 'friend'. In the proper name Hebron, the original sense may have been 'alliance'.

Early Muslim sources refer to the city as Ḥabra (حبرة) or Ḥabrūn (حبرون). al-Khalīl emerged as the Arabic name for the city in the 13th century, derived from the Qur'anic epithet for Abraham, Khalīl al-Raḥmān ('Friend of the Merciful [i.e. God]'). Thus, the epithet is a calque of the original Hebrew toponym Ḥeḇrōn, understood as ḥaḇēr ('friend').

== History ==
=== Early Bronze Age ===
Archaeological excavations reveal traces of strong fortifications dated to the Early Bronze Age, covering some 24–30 dunams centered around Tel Rumeida.

=== Middle and Late Bronze Ages ===
The city flourished in the 17th–18th centuries BCE before being destroyed by fire, and was resettled in the late Middle Bronze Age. This older Hebron was originally a Canaanite royal city. Abrahamic legend associates the city with the Hittites. It has been conjectured that Hebron might have been the capital of Shuwardata of Gath, an Indo-European contemporary of Jerusalem's regent, Abdi-Ḫeba, although the Hebron hills were almost devoid of settlements in the Late Bronze Age.

=== Ancient Israel ===
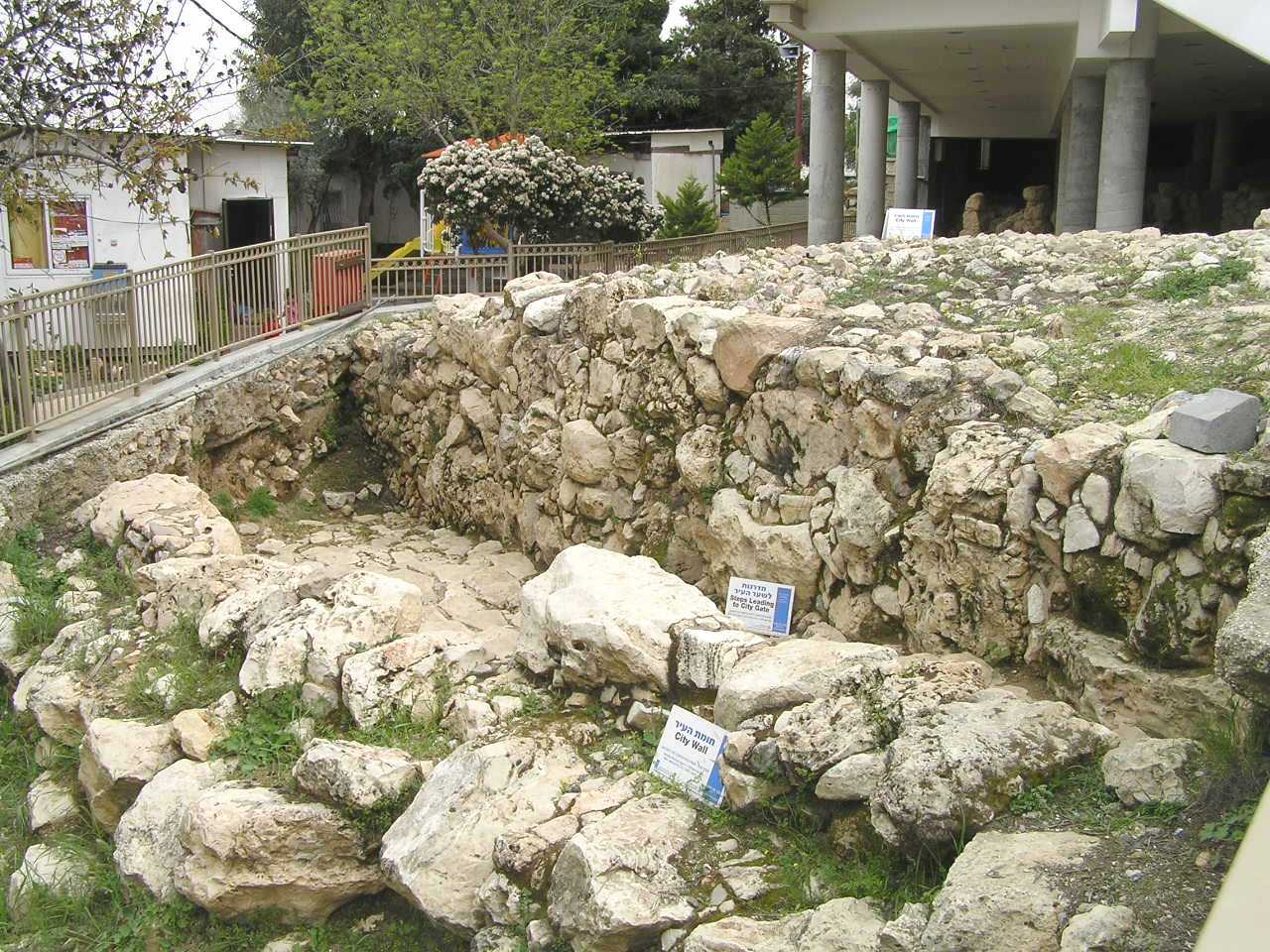
Excavations at Tel Rumeida

The Abrahamic traditions associated with Hebron are nomadic. This may also reflect a Kenite element, since the nomadic Kenites are said to have long occupied the city, and Heber is the name for a Kenite clan. In the narrative of the later Hebrew conquest, Hebron was one of two centers under Canaanite control. They were ruled by the three sons of Anak (b^{e}nê/y^{e}lîdê hāʿănaq). or may reflect some Kenite and Kenizzite migration from the Negev to Hebron, since terms related to the Kenizzites appear to be close to Hurrian. This suggests that behind the Anakim legend lies some early Hurrian population. In Biblical lore they are represented as descendants of the Nephilim. The Book of Genesis mentions that it was formerly called Kiryath-arba, or "city of four", possibly referring to the four pairs or couples who were buried there, or four tribes, or four quarters, four hills, or a confederated settlement of four families.

The story of Abraham's purchase of the Cave of the Patriarchs from the Hittites constitutes a seminal element in what was to become the Jewish attachment to the land in that it signified the first "real estate" of Israel long before the conquest under Joshua. In settling here, Abraham is described as making his first covenant, an alliance with two local Amorite clans who became his ba'alei brit or masters of the covenant.

The Hebron of the Israelites was centered on what is now known as Tel Rumeida, while its ritual center was located at Elonei Mamre. Hebrew Bible narrative also describes the city.

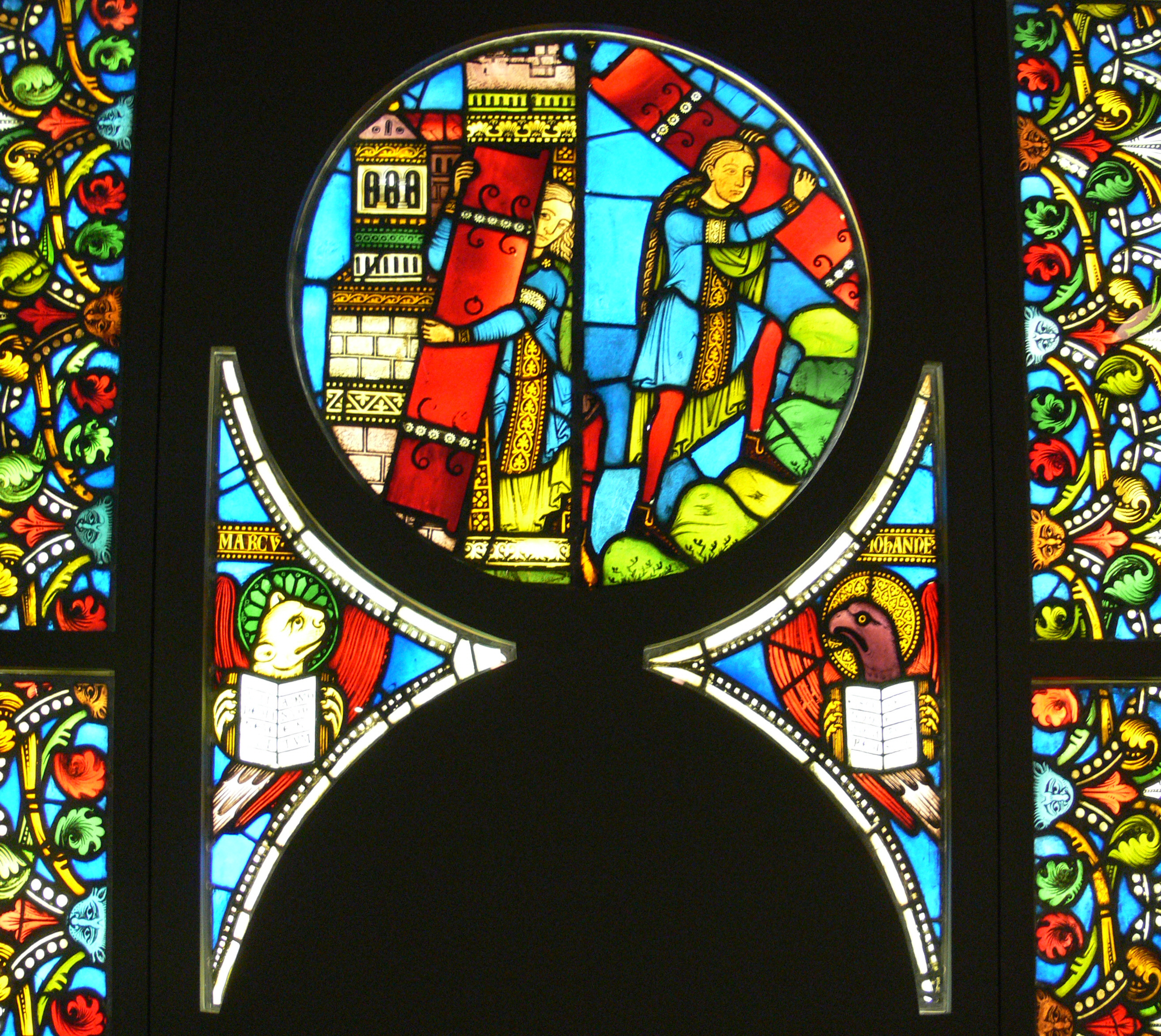
Samson removes gates of Gaza (left) and brings them to Mount Hebron (right). Strassburg (1160–1170), Württemberg State Museum in Stuttgart

It is said to have been wrested from the Canaanites by either Joshua, who is said to have wiped out all of its previous inhabitants, "destroying everything that drew breath, as the Lord God of Israel had commanded", or the Tribe of Judah as a whole, or specifically Caleb the Judahite. The town itself, with some contiguous pasture land, is then said to have been granted to the Levites of the clan of Kohath, while the fields of the city, as well as its surrounding villages were assigned to Caleb (Joshua 21:3–12; 1 Chronicles 6:54–56), who expels the three giants, Sheshai, Ahiman, and Talmai, who ruled the city. Later, the biblical narrative has King David called by God to relocate to Hebron and reign from there for some seven years (2 Samuel 2:1–3). It is there that the elders of Israel come to him to make a covenant before Elohim and anoint him king of Israel. It was in Hebron again that Absalom has himself declared king and then raises a revolt against his father David (2 Samuel 15:7–10). It became one of the principal centers of the Tribe of Judah and was classified as one of the six traditional Cities of Refuge.

As is shown by the discovery at Lachish, the second most important city in the Kingdom of Judah after Jerusalem, of seals with the inscription lmlk Hebron (to the king Hebron), Hebron continued to constitute an important local economic center, given its strategic position on the crossroads between the Dead Sea to the east, Jerusalem to the north, the Negev and Egypt to the south, and the Shepelah and the coastal plain to the west. Lying along trading routes, it remained administratively and politically dependent on Jerusalem for this period.

=== Persian and Hellenistic periods ===
After the destruction of the First Temple, most of the Jewish inhabitants of Hebron were exiled, and according to the conventional view, some researchers found traces of Edomite presence after the 5th–4th centuries BCE, as the area became Achaemenid province, and, in the wake of Alexander the Great's conquest, Hebron was throughout the Hellenistic period under the influence of Idumea (as the new area inhabited by the Edomites was called during the Persian, Hellenistic and Roman periods), as is attested by inscriptions for that period bearing names with the Edomite God Qōs.

During the Hellenistic period, Tell Rumeida was occupied by a settlement whose pottery resembles that of Maresha and, still more closely, that of rural Idumaean sites such as Khirbet er-Rasm, though it lacks the imported ware and fine table vessels characteristic of Maresha. The material culture combines Edomite and Hellenistic elements.

Jews also appear to have lived there after the return from the Babylonian exile (Nehemiah 11:25). According to 1 Maccabees, during the Maccabean Revolt, Hebron was burned and plundered by Judah Maccabee, who fought against the Edomites, "sons of Esau", in the 160s BCE. The city's fortifications, however, had been destroyed by the Babylonians in 587/6 BCE and were not rebuilt in the Hellenistic period, so the account cannot be reconciled with the archaeological evidence; it may preserve the memory of a general campaign against the inhabitants of the Hebron region instead.

=== Hasmonean and Herodian periods ===
The settlement at Tel Rumeida was destroyed, probably during the Hasmonean conquest of Idumaea by John Hyrcanus, circa 112 or 107 BCE. The destruction layers of Maresha and Khirbet er-Rasm, dated to 112/111 BCE, provide an archaeological anchor. Settlement at Tel Rumeida continued in the following stratum, which yielded pottery typical of Hasmonean sites, together with Hasmonean coins of John Hyrcanus and Alexander Jannaeus. During the Herodian period, stone vessels and ritual baths (mikva'ot) also appear.

The finds from the Hasmonean and Herodian periods indicate that the site was then inhabited by a population with Jewish characteristics. The archaeological evidence cannot determine whether the local Idumaean population remained and converted, willingly or under coercion, or was replaced by new Jewish settlers or by converted Idumaeans. As late as the First Jewish–Roman War the area was still considered Idumaean.

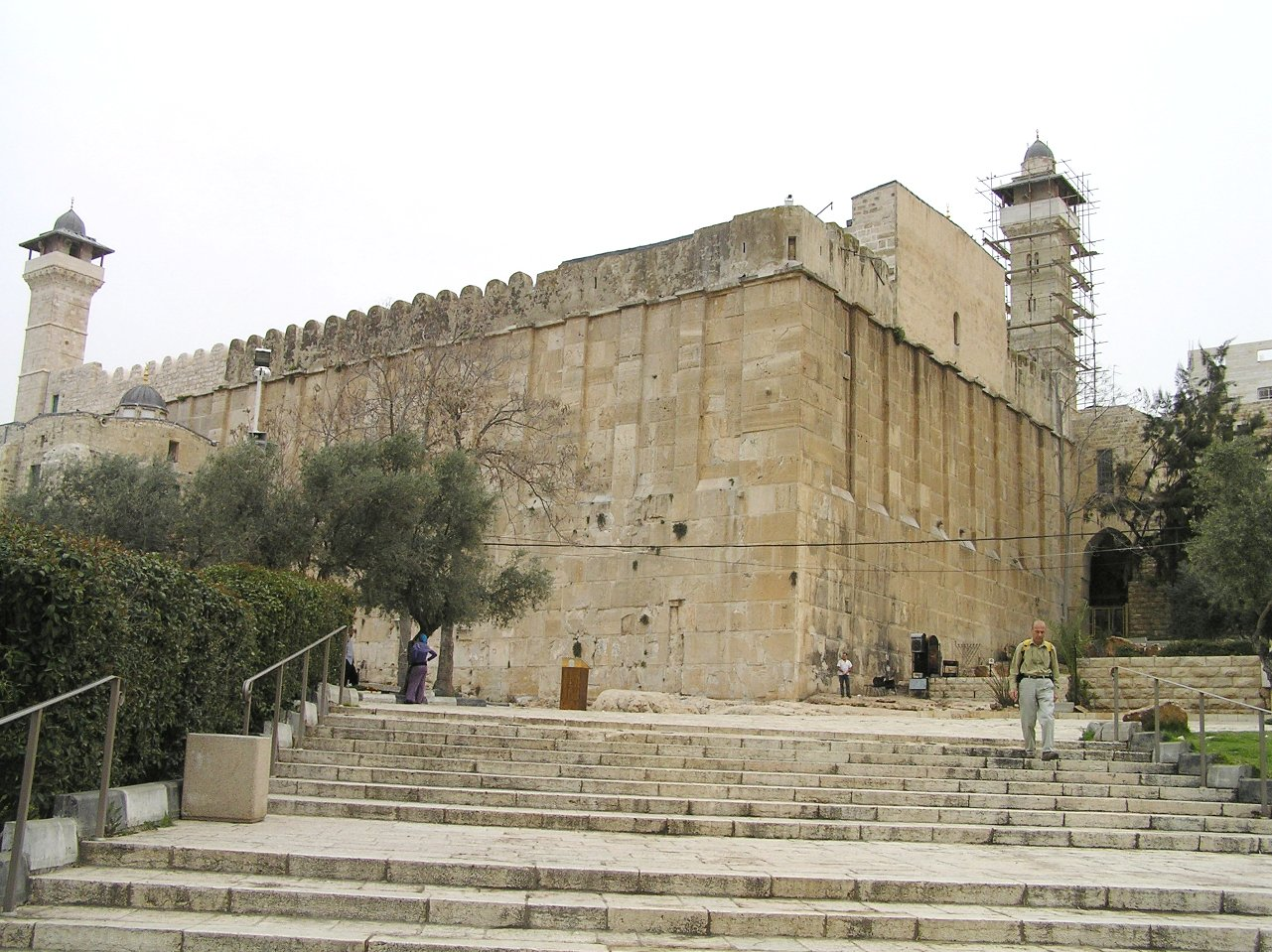
Cave of the Patriarchs

=== Roman rule ===
The present day city of Hebron was settled in the valley downhill from Tel Rumeida at the latest by Roman times. Herod the Great, king of Judea, built the wall that still surrounds the Cave of the Patriarchs. During the First Jewish–Roman War, Hebron was captured and plundered by Simon Bar Giora, a leader of the Zealots, without bloodshed. The "little town" was later laid to waste by Vespasian's officer Sextus Vettulenus Cerialis. Josephus wrote that he "slew all he found there, young and old, and burnt down the town". After the suppression of the Bar Kokhba revolt in 135 CE, innumerable Jewish captives were sold into slavery at Hebron's Terebinth slave-market.

The city was part of the Byzantine Empire in Palaestina Prima province at the Diocese of the East. The Byzantine emperor Justinian I erected a Christian church over the Cave of Machpelah in the 6th century CE, which was later destroyed by the Sassanid general Shahrbaraz in 614 when Khosrau II's armies besieged and took Jerusalem. Jews were not permitted to reside in Hebron under Byzantine rule. The sanctuary itself however was spared by the Persians, in deference to the Jewish population, who were numerous in the Sassanid army.

=== Muslim conquest and Islamic caliphate ===
Hebron was one of the last cities of Palestine to fall to the Islamic invasion in the 7th century, possibly the reason why Hebron is not mentioned in any traditions of the Arab conquest. When the Rashidun Caliphate established its rule over Hebron in 638, the Muslims converted the Byzantine church at the site of Abraham's tomb into a mosque. It became an important station on the caravan trading route from Egypt, and also as a way-station for pilgrims making the yearly hajj from Damascus. After the fall of the city, Jerusalem's conqueror, Caliph Omar ibn al-Khattab permitted Jewish people to return and to construct a small synagogue within the Herodian precinct.

Catholic bishop Arculf, who visited the Holy Land during the Umayyad period, described the city as unfortified and poor. In his writings he also mentioned camel caravans transporting firewood from Hebron to Jerusalem, which implies there was a presence of Arab nomads in the region at that time. Trade greatly expanded, in particular with Bedouins in the Negev (al-Naqab) and the population to the east of the Dead Sea (Baḥr Lūṭ). According to Anton Kisa, Jews from Hebron (and Tyre) founded the Venetian glass industry in the 9th century.

Hebron was almost absent from Muslim literature before the 10th century. In 985, al-Muqaddasi described Hebron (Habra) as the village of Abraham al-Khalil, with a strong fortress and a stone dome over Abraham's sepulchre. The mosque contained the tombs of Isaac, Jacob, and their wives. Surrounding the area were villages with vineyards producing exceptional grapes and apples. Hebron had a public guest house offering lentils and olive oil to both the poor and the rich. The guest house was established through the bequest of Prophet Muhammad's companions, including Tamim-al Dari, and received generous donations. It was highly regarded as an excellent house of hospitality and charity in the realm of al-Islam. The custom, known as the 'Table of Abraham' (simāt al-khalil), was similar to the one established by the Fatimids. In 1047, Nasir-i-Khusraw described Hebron in his Safarnama as having many villages providing revenues for pious purposes. He mentioned a spring flowing from under a stone, with water channeled to a covered tank outside the town. The Sanctuary stood on the town's southern border, enclosed by four walls. Barley was the primary crop, with abundant olives. Visitors were provided with bread, olives, lentils cooked in olive oil, and raisins. Hebron had numerous mills operated by oxen and mules, along with working girls baking bread. The hospitality extended to about three-pound loaves of bread and meals for every arriving person, including up to 500 pilgrims on certain days.

The tradition survives to this day in the form of the Takiat Ibrahim soup kitchen, which has been active in providing food for thousands over Ramadan, which coincided with food shortages during the 2024 Gaza war. Geniza documents from this period mention "the graves of the patriarchs" and attest to the presence of an organized Jewish community in Hebron. The Jews maintained a synagogue near the tomb and earned their livelihood accommodating Jewish pilgrims and merchants. During the Seljuk period, the community was headed by Saadia b. Abraham b. Nathan, known as the "haver of the graves of the patriarchs."

=== Crusader and Ayyubid period ===
The Caliphate lasted in the area until 1099, when the Christian Crusader Godfrey de Bouillon took Hebron and renamed it "Castellion Saint Abraham". It was designated capital of the southern district of the Crusader Kingdom of Jerusalem and given, in turn, as the fief of Saint Abraham, to Geldemar Carpinel, Gerard of Avesnes, Hugh of Rebecques, Walter Mohamet and Baldwin of Saint Abraham. As a Frankish garrison of the Kingdom of Jerusalem, its defense was precarious being "little more than an island in a Moslem ocean". The Crusaders converted the mosque and the synagogue into a church. In 1106, an Egyptian campaign thrust into southern Palestine and almost succeeded the following year in wresting Hebron back from the Crusaders under Baldwin I of Jerusalem, who personally led the counter-charge to beat the Muslim forces off. In the year 1113 during the reign of Baldwin II of Jerusalem, according to Ali of Herat (writing in 1173), a certain part over the cave of Abraham had given way, and "a number of Franks had made their entrance therein". And they discovered "(the bodies) of Abraham, Isaac and Jacob", "their shrouds having fallen to pieces, lying propped up against a wall...Then the King, after providing new shrouds, caused the place to be closed once more". Similar information is given in Ibn at Athir's Chronicle under the year 1119; "In this year was opened the tomb of Abraham, and those of his two sons Isaac and Jacob ...Many people saw the Patriarch. Their limbs had nowise been disturbed, and beside them were placed lamps of gold and of silver." The Damascene nobleman and historian Ibn al-Qalanisi in his chronicle also alludes at this time to the discovery of relics purported to be those of Abraham, Isaac and Jacob, a discovery that excited eager curiosity among all three communities in Palestine, Muslim, Jewish, and Christian. Towards the end of the period of Crusader rule, in 1166 Maimonides visited Hebron and wrote

On Sunday, 9 Marheshvan (17 October), I left Jerusalem for Hebron to kiss the tombs of my ancestors in the Cave. On that day, I stood in the cave and prayed, praise be to God, (in gratitude) for everything.

A royal domain, Hebron was handed over to Philip of Milly in 1161 and joined with the Seigneurie of Transjordan. A bishop was appointed to Hebron in 1168 and the new cathedral church of St Abraham was built in the southern part of the Haram. In 1167, the episcopal see of Hebron was created along with that of Kerak and Sebastia (the tomb of John the Baptist). In 1170, Benjamin of Tudela visited Hebron, referred to as in its Frankish name St. Abram de Bron. He mentioned the great church called St. Abram, which was once a Jewish place of worship during the time of Muslim rule. The Gentiles had erected six tombs there, claimed to be those of Abraham, Sarah, Isaac, Rebekah, Jacob, and Leah. The custodians collected money from pilgrims by presenting these tombs as the tombs of the Patriarchs. However, if a Jew offered a special reward, they would open an iron gate leading to a series of empty caves, until reaching the third cave where the actual sepulchers of the Patriarchs and Matriarchs were said to be located.

The Kurdish Muslim Saladin retook Hebron in 1187 – again with Jewish assistance according to one late tradition, in exchange for a letter of security allowing them to return to the city and build a synagogue there. The name of the city was changed back to Al-Khalil. A Kurdish quarter still existed in the town during the early period of Ottoman rule. Richard the Lionheart retook the city soon after. Richard of Cornwall, brought from England to settle the dangerous feuding between Templars and Hospitallers, whose rivalry imperiled the treaty guaranteeing regional stability stipulated with the Egyptian Sultan As-Salih Ayyub, managed to impose peace on the area. But soon after his departure, feuding broke out and in 1241 the Templars mounted a damaging raid on what was, by now, Muslim Hebron, in violation of agreements.

In 1244, the Khwarazmians destroyed the town, but left the sanctuary untouched.

=== Mamluk period ===
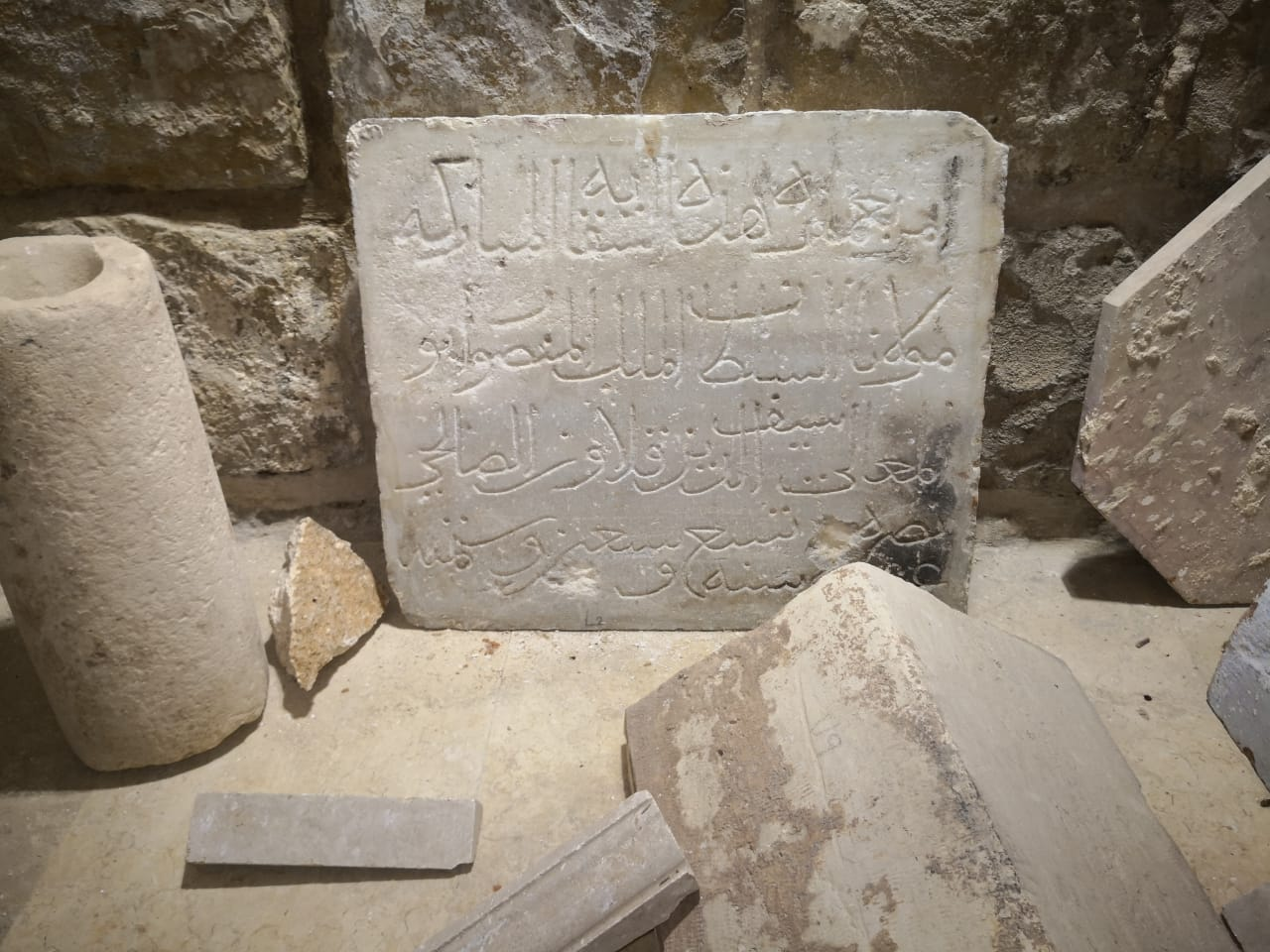
A Mamluk-era marble inscription, crediting the renovation of a water basin adjacent to takiat Ibrahim to Qalawun in the year 679 AH (1280/1281 CE)

In 1260, after Mamluk Sultan Baibars defeated the Mongol army, the minarets were built onto the sanctuary. Six years later, while on pilgrimage to Hebron, Baibars promulgated an edict forbidding Christians and Jews from entering the sanctuary, and the climate became less tolerant of Jews and Christians than it had been under the prior Ayyubid rule. The edict for the exclusion of Christians and Jews was not strictly enforced until the middle of the 14th century and by 1490, not even Muslims were permitted to enter the caverns. The mill at Artas was built in 1307, and the profits from its income were dedicated to the hospital in Hebron. Between 1318 and 1320, the Na'ib of Gaza and much of coastal and interior Palestine ordered the construction of Jawli Mosque to enlarge the prayer space for worshipers at the Ibrahimi Mosque.

Hebron was visited by important rabbis over the next two centuries, among them Nachmanides (1270) and Ishtori HaParchi (1322) who noted the old Jewish cemetery there. Sunni imam Ibn Qayyim Al-Jawziyya (1292–1350) was penalized by the religious authorities in Damascus for refusing to recognize Hebron as a Muslim pilgrimage site, a view also held by his teacher Ibn Taymiyyah. The Jewish-Italian traveler, Meshullam of Volterra (1481) found not more than twenty Jewish families living in Hebron. and recounted how the Jewish women of Hebron would disguise themselves with a veil in order to pass as Muslim women and enter the Cave of the Patriarchs without being recognized as Jews. Minute descriptions of Hebron were recorded in Stephen von Gumpenberg's Journal (1449), by Felix Fabri (1483) and by Mejr ed-Din It was in this period, also, that the Mamluk Sultan Qa'it Bay revived the old custom of the Hebron "table of Abraham", and exported it as a model for his own madrasa in Medina. This became an immense charitable establishment near the Haram, distributing daily some 1,200 loaves of bread to travelers of all faiths. The Italian rabbi Obadiah ben Abraham Bartenura wrote around 1490:

I was in the Cave of Machpelah, over which the mosque has been built; and the Arabs hold the place in high honour. All the Kings of the Arabs come here to repeat their prayers, but neither a Jew nor an Arab may enter the Cave itself, where the real graves of the Patriarchs are; the Arabs remain above, and let down burning torches into it through a window, for they keep a light always burning there. Bread and lentil, or some other kind of pulse (seeds of peas or beans), is distributed (by the Muslims) to the poor every day without distinction of faith, and this is done in honour of Abraham.

=== Early Ottoman period ===
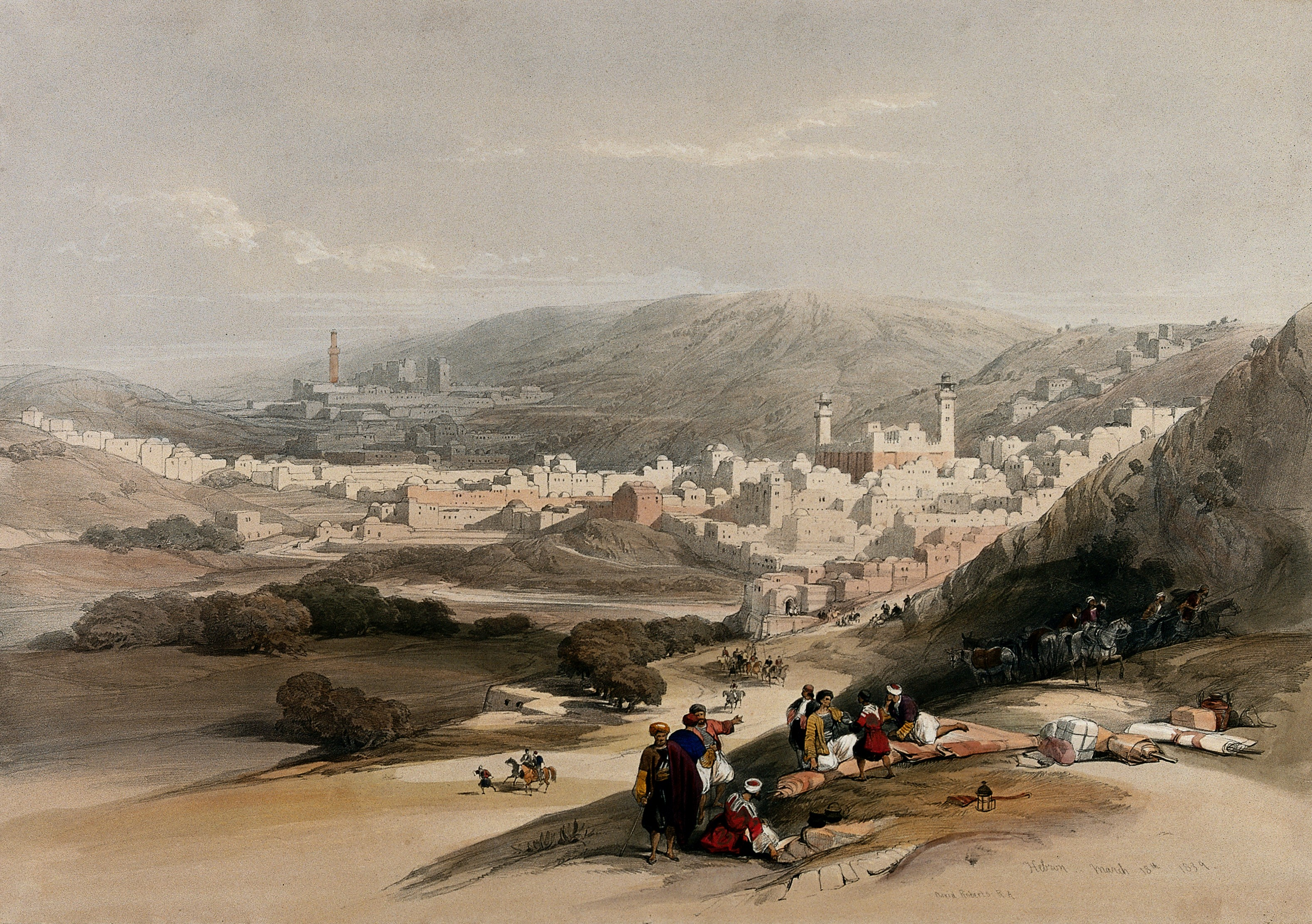
Hebron in 1839, after a drawing by David Roberts, in The Holy Land, Syria, Idumea, Arabia, Egypt, and Nubia

The expansion of the Ottoman Empire along the southern Mediterranean coast under sultan Selim I coincided with the establishment of Inquisition commissions by the Catholic Monarchs in Spain in 1478, which ended centuries of the Iberian convivencia (coexistence). The ensuing expulsions of the Jews drove many Sephardi Jews into the Ottoman provinces, and a slow influx of Jews to the Holy Land took place, with notable Sephardi kabbalists settling in Hebron. Over the following two centuries, there was a significant migration of Bedouin tribal groups from the Arabian Peninsula into Palestine. Many settled in three separate villages in the Wādī al-Khalīl, and their descendants later formed the majority of Hebron.

The Jewish community fluctuated between eight and ten families throughout the 16th century, and suffered from severe financial straits in the first half of the century. In 1540, renowned kabbalist Malkiel Ashkenazi bought a courtyard from the small Karaite community, in which he established the Sephardic Abraham Avinu Synagogue. In 1659, Abraham Pereyra of Amsterdam founded the Hesed Le'Abraham yeshiva in Hebron, which attracted many students. In the early 18th century, the Jewish community suffered from heavy debts, almost quadrupling from 1717 to 1729, and were "almost crushed" from the extortion practiced by the Turkish pashas. In 1773 or 1775, a substantial amount of money was extorted from the Jewish community after a false allegation that the son of a local sheikh was murdered and thrown into a cesspit. Emissaries from the community were frequently sent overseas to solicit funds. During the Ottoman period, the dilapidated patriarchs' tombs were restored to a semblance of dignity. Ali Bey, in Muslim disguise, was one of the few Westerners to gain access. In 1807 he reported that the sepulchres were covered with carpets of green silk embroidered in gold and those of the wives were covered in red silk.The sultans of Constantinople furnished these carpets, which were renewed from time to time. Ali Bey counted nine, one over the other, on the sepulchre of Abraham. Hebron also became known for its glass production, based on Bedouin trade networks that brought up minerals from the Dead Sea. The industry is mentioned in travel literature in 19th century written by Western travelers to Palestine. Ulrich Jasper Seetzen noted during his travels in Palestine in 1808–09 that 150 persons were employed in the glass industry in Hebron, based on 26 kilns. In 1833, a report on the town in the weekly paper of the London-based Religious Tract Society wrote that Hebron had numerous well-provisioned shops and produced glass lamps which were exported to Egypt. Early 19th-century travelers also noted Hebron's flourishing agriculture. It was a major exporter of dibse, grape sugar, from the famous Dabookeh grapestock characteristic of Hebron.

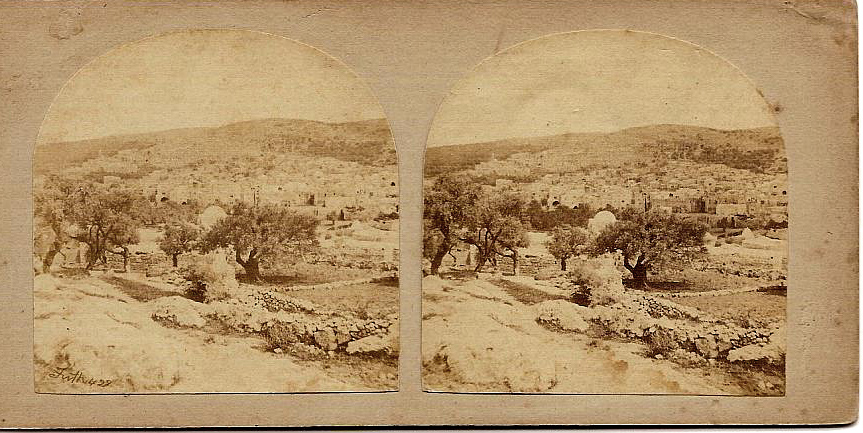
Northern Hebron in the mid-19th century (1850s)

An Arab peasants' revolt broke out in April 1834 when Ibrahim Pasha of Egypt announced he would recruit troops from the local Muslim population. Hebron, headed by its nazir Abd ar-Rahman Amr, declined to supply its quota of conscripts for the army and suffered badly from the Egyptian campaign to crush the uprising. The town was invested and, when its defenses fell on 4 August, it was sacked by Ibrahim Pasha's army. An estimated 500 Muslims from Hebron were killed in the attack and some 750 were conscripted. 120 youths were abducted and put at the disposal of Egyptian army officers. Most of the Muslim population managed to flee beforehand to the hills. Many Jews fled to Jerusalem, but during the general pillage of the town at least five were killed. When the government of Ibrahim Pasha fell in 1841, the local clan leader Abd ar-Rahman Amr once again resumed the reins of power as the Sheik of Hebron. Due to his extortionate demands for cash from the local population, most of the Jewish population fled to Jerusalem. In 1846, the Ottoman Governor-in-chief of Jerusalem (serasker), Kıbrıslı Mehmed Emin Pasha, waged a campaign to subdue rebellious sheiks in the Hebron area, and while doing so, allowed his troops to sack the town. Though it was widely rumored that he secretly protected Abd ar-Rahman, the latter was deported together with other local leaders (such as Muslih al-'Azza of Bayt Jibrin), but he managed to return to the area in 1848.

According to Hillel Cohen, the attacks on Jews in this particular period are an exception that proves the rule, that one of the easiest place for Jews to live in the world were in the various countries of the Ottoman Empire. In the mid-eighteenth century, rabbi Abraham Gershon of Kitov wrote from Hebron that:"the gentiles here very much love the Jews. When there is a brit milah (circumcision ceremony) or any other celebration, their most important men come at night and rejoice with the Jews and clap hands and dance with the Jews, just like the Jews'."

=== Late Ottoman period ===
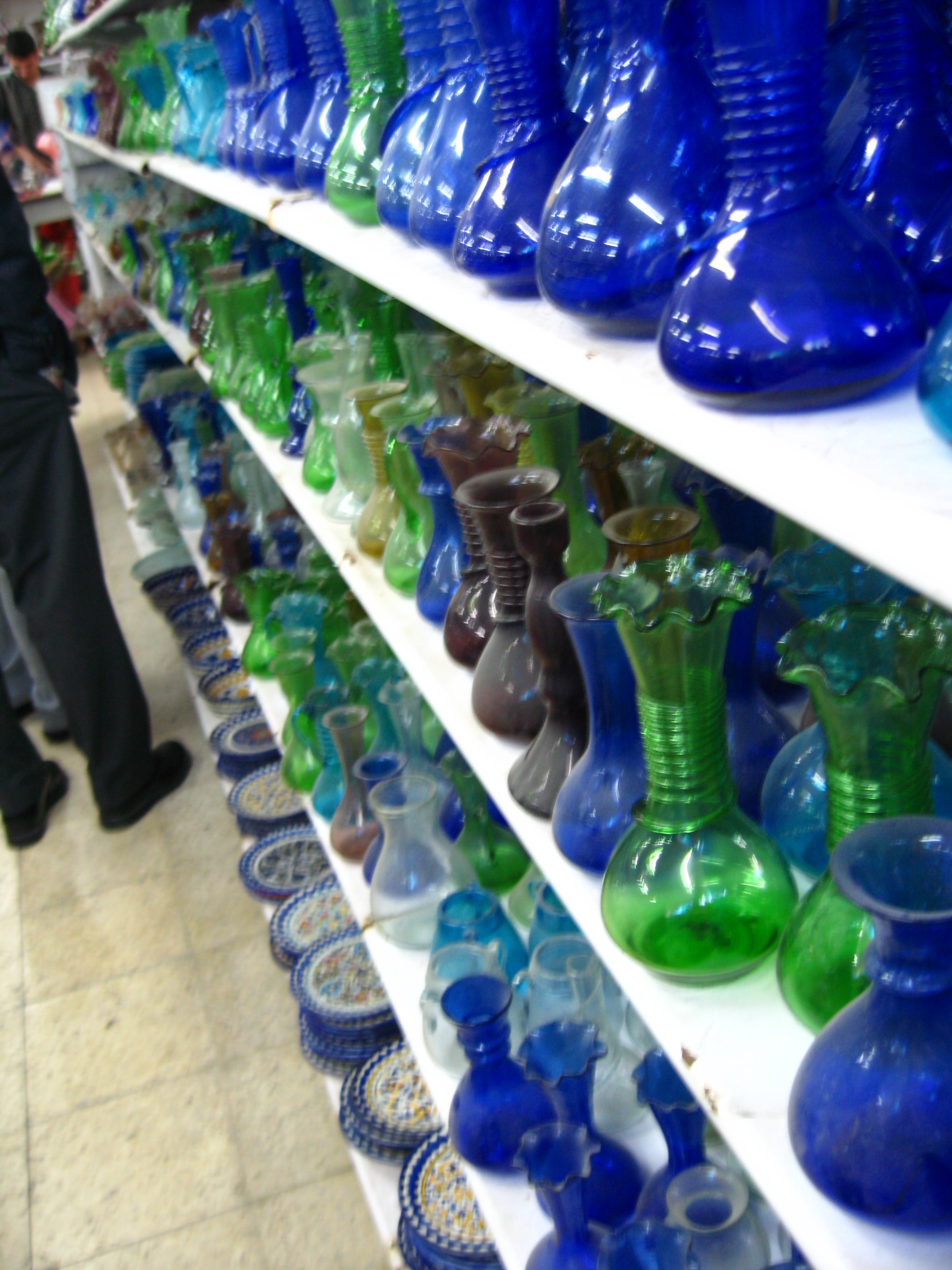
A display of Hebron glass

By 1850, the Jewish population consisted of 45–60 Sephardic families, some 40 born in the town, and a 30-year-old Ashkenazic community of 50 families, mainly Polish and Russian, the Lubavitch Hasidic movement having established a community in 1823. The ascendency of Ibrahim Pasha led to a decline in the local glass industry. His plan to build a Mediterranean fleet led to severe logging in Hebron's forests, making firewood for the kilns scarce. At the same time, Egypt began importing cheap European glass. The rerouting of the hajj from Damascus through Transjordan reduced traffic to Hebron, and the Suez Canal (1869) precipitated a drop in caravan trade. The consequence was a steady deterioration of the local economy. At the time, the town was divided into four quarters: the Ancient Quarter (Harat al-Kadim) near the Cave of Machpelah; to its south, the Quarter of the Silk Merchant (Harat al-Kazaz), inhabited by Jews; the Mamluk-era Sheikh's Quarter (Harat ash Sheikh) to the north-west; and further north, the Dense Quarter (Harat al-Harbah).

Jews in Hebron, 1921

In 1855, the newly appointed Ottoman pasha ("governor") of the sanjak ("district") of Jerusalem, Kamil Pasha, attempted to put down a rebellion in the Hebron region. Kamil and his army marched towards Hebron in July 1855, a scene witnessed by representatives of the English, French and other Western consulates. After crushing all opposition, Kamil appointed Salama Amr, brother and rival of Abd al Rachman, as nazir of the Hebron region. Relative quiet reigned in the town for the next 4 years. In 1866, Hungarian Jews of the Karlin Hasidic court settled in Hebron. According to Nadav Shragai, Arab-Jewish relations were good, and Alter Rivlin, who spoke Arabic and Syrian-Aramaic, was appointed Jewish representative to the city council. During a severe drought in 1869–1871, food in Hebron sold for ten times the normal amount. From 1874, the Hebron district was administered directly from Istanbul as part of the Sanjak of Jerusalem. By 1874, when C.R. Conder visited Hebron under the auspices of the Palestine Exploration Fund, the Jewish community numbered 600 in an overall population of 17,000. The Jews lived in the Quarter of the Corner Gate. In the late 19th century the production of Hebron glass declined due to competition from imported European glassware, although it continued to be popular among those who could not afford luxury goods and was sold by Jewish merchants. Glass ornaments from Hebron were exhibited at the World Fair of 1873 in Vienna.

A report from the consul of the French Consulate in Jerusalem in 1886 suggests that glass-making remained an important source of income for Hebron, with four factories earning 60,000 francs yearly. While the economy of other cities in Palestine was based on solely on trade, the economy of Hebron was more diverse, including agriculture and livestock herding, along with glassware manufacturing and processing of hides. This was because the most fertile lands were situated within the city limits. Even so, Hebron had an image of being unproductive and an "asylum for the poor and the spiritual". While the wealthy merchants of Nablus built fine mansions, housing in Hebron consisted of semi-peasant dwellings.

Hebron was described as 'deeply Bedouin and Islamic', and 'bleakly conservative' in its religious outlook, with a strong tradition of hostility to Jews. It had a reputation for religious zeal in jealously protecting its sites from Jews and Christians, although the Jewish and Christian communities seem to have been an integral part of the local economy. As income from commerce declined and tax revenues diminished significantly, the Ottoman government left Hebron to manage its own affairs for the most part, making it "one of the most autonomous regions in late Ottoman Palestine." The Jewish community was under French protection until 1914. The Jewish presence itself was divided between the traditional Sephardi community, whose members spoke Arabic and adopted Arab dress, and the more recent influx of Ashkenazi Jews. They prayed in different synagogues, sent their children to different schools, lived in different quarters and did not intermarry. The community was largely Orthodox and anti-Zionist.

=== British Mandate period ===
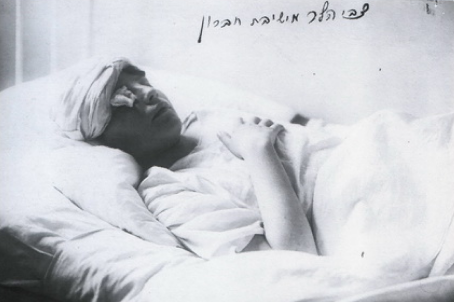
Jewish child victim of Arab riots during the Hebron massacre, 1929

The British occupied Hebron on 8 December 1917; governance transited to a mandate in 1920. Most of Hebron was owned by old Islamic charitable endowments (waqfs), with about 60% of all the land in and around Hebron belonging to the Tamīm al-Dārī waqf. During the 1920s, Abd al-Ḥayy al-Khaṭīb was appointed Mufti of Hebron. Before his appointment, he had been a staunch opponent of Haj Amin, supported the Muslim National Associations and had good contacts with the Zionists. Later, al-Khaṭīb became one of the few loyal followers of Haj Amin in Hebron. During the late Ottoman period, a new ruling elite had emerged in Palestine. They later formed the core of the growing Arab nationalist movement in the early 20th century. During the Mandate period, delegates from Hebron constituted only 1 percent of the political leadership. The Palestinian Arab decision to boycott the 1923 elections for a Legislative Council was made at the fifth Palestinian Congress, after it was reported by Murshid Shahin (an Arab pro-Zionist activist) that there was intense resistance in Hebron to the elections. Almost no house in Hebron remained undamaged when an earthquake struck Palestine on 11 July 1927.

The Cave of the Patriarchs continued to remain officially closed to non-Muslims, and reports that entry to the site had been relaxed in 1928 were denied by the Supreme Muslim Council.

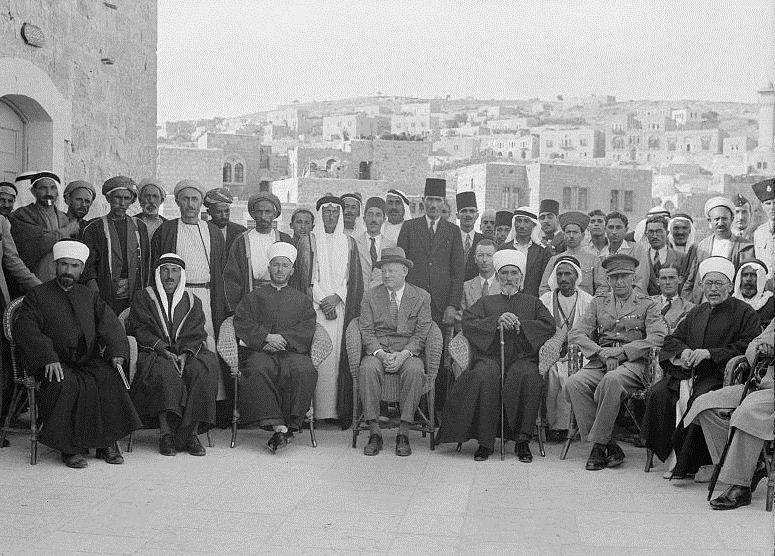
British loyalty meeting in Hebron, July 1940

At this time following attempts by the Lithuanian government to draft yeshiva students into the army, the Lithuanian Hebron Yeshiva (Knesses Yisroel) relocated to Hebron, after consultations between Rabbi Nosson Tzvi Finkel, Yechezkel Sarna and Moshe Mordechai Epstein. and by 1929 had attracted some 265 students from Europe and the United States. The majority of the Jewish population lived on the outskirts of Hebron along the roads to Be'ersheba and Jerusalem, renting homes owned by Arabs, a number of which were built for the express purpose of housing Jewish tenants, with a few dozen within the city around the synagogues. During the 1929 Hebron massacre, Arab rioters slaughtered some 64 to 67 Jewish men, women and children and wounded 60, and Jewish homes and synagogues were ransacked; 435 Jews survived by virtue of the shelter and assistance offered them by their Arab neighbors, who hid them. Some Hebron Arabs, including Ahmad Rashid al-Hirbawi, president of Hebron chamber of commerce, supported the return of Jews after the massacre. Two years later, 35 families moved back into the ruins of the Jewish quarter, but on the eve of the Palestinian Arab revolt (23 April 1936) the British Government decided to move the Jewish community out of Hebron as a precautionary measure to secure its safety. The sole exception was the 8th generation Hebronite Ya'akov ben Shalom Ezra, who processed dairy products in the city, blended in well with its social landscape and resided there under the protection of friends. In November 1947, in anticipation of the UN partition vote, the Ezra family closed its shop and left the city. Yossi Ezra has since tried to regain his family's property through the Israeli courts.

=== Jordanian occupation ===
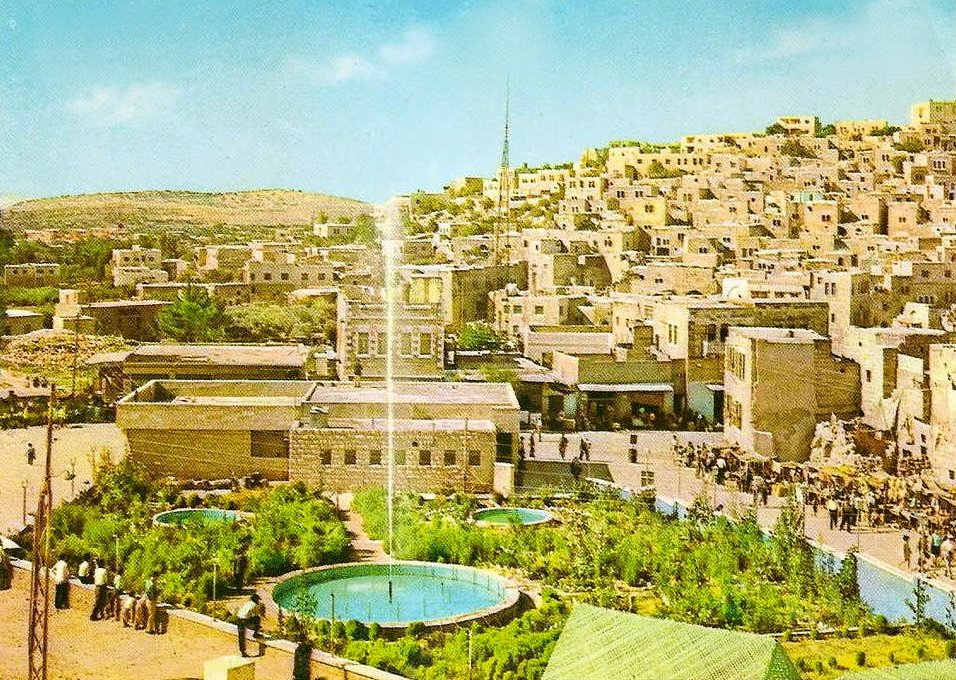
Hebron in the 1960s under Jordanian rule

At the beginning of the 1948 Arab–Israeli War, Egypt took control of Hebron. Between May and October, Egypt and Jordan tussled for dominance in Hebron and its environs. Both countries appointed military governors in the town, hoping to gain recognition from Hebron officials. The Egyptians managed to persuade the pro-Jordanian mayor to support their rule, at least superficially, but local opinion turned against them when they imposed taxes. Villagers surrounding Hebron resisted and skirmishes broke out in which some were killed. By late 1948, part of the Egyptian forces from Bethlehem to Hebron had been cut off from their lines of supply and Glubb Pasha sent 350 Arab Legionnaires and an armored car unit to Hebron to reinforce them there. When the Armistice was signed, the city thus fell under Jordanian military control. The armistice agreement between Israel with Jordan intended to allow Israeli Jewish pilgrims to visit Hebron, but, as Jews of all nationalities were forbidden by Jordan into the country, this did not occur.

In December 1948, the Jericho Conference, held by Jordan, was convened to decide the future of the West Bank. Hebron notables, headed by mayor Muhamad 'Ali al-Ja'bari, voted in favor of becoming part of Jordan and to recognize Abdullah I of Jordan as their king. The subsequent unilateral annexation benefited the Arabs of Hebron, who during the 1950s, played a significant role in the economic development of Jordan.

Although a significant number of people relocated to Jerusalem from Hebron during the Jordanian period, Hebron itself saw a considerable increase in population with 35,000 settling in the town. During this period, signs of the previous Jewish presence in Hebron were removed.

=== Israeli occupation ===
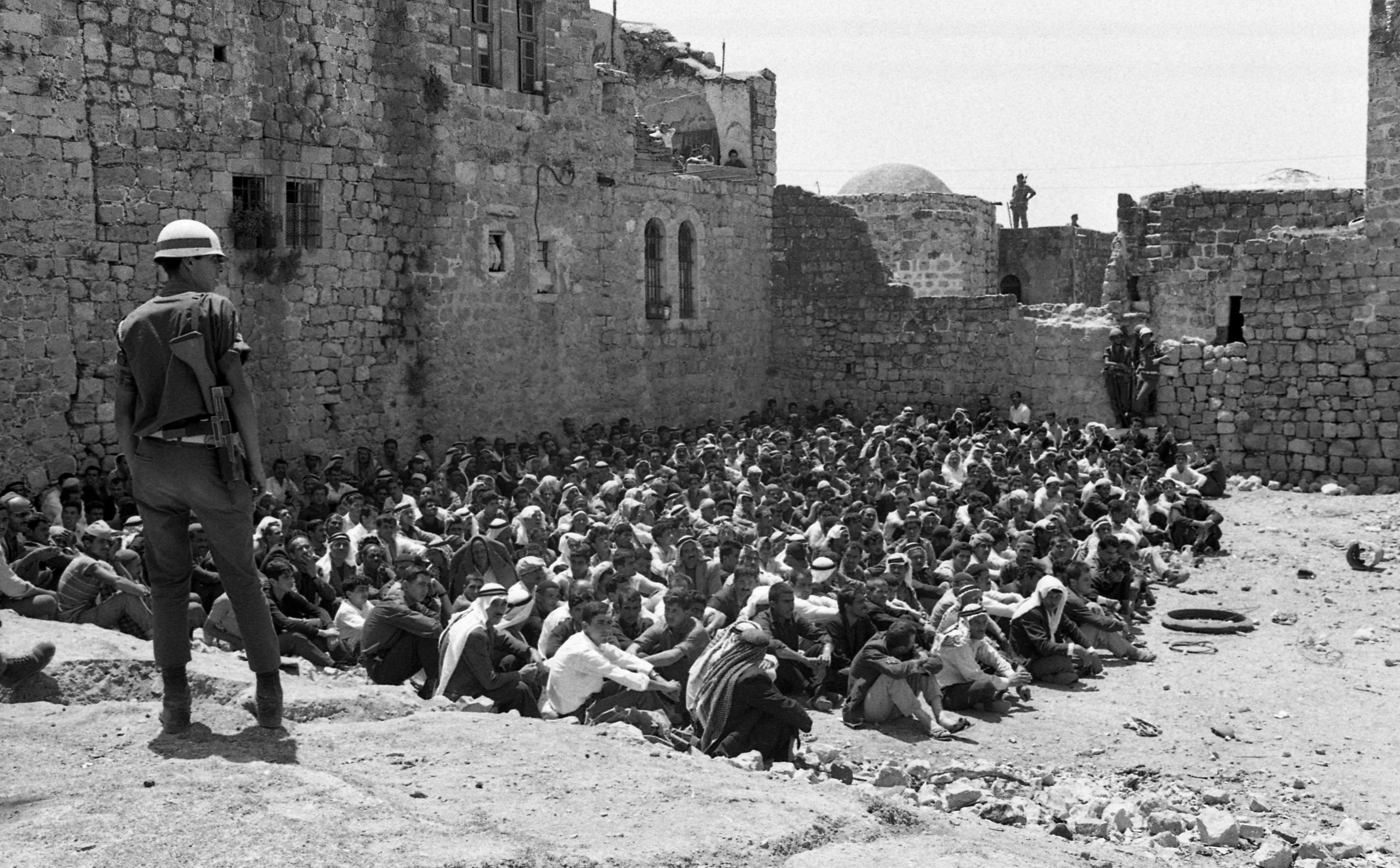
Israeli soldiers enforcing the curfew, 1969

After the Six-Day War in June 1967, Israel occupied Hebron along with the rest of the West Bank, establishing a military government to rule the area. In an attempt to reach a land for peace deal, Yigal Allon proposed that Israel annex 45% of the West Bank and return the remainder to Jordan. According to the Allon Plan, the city of Hebron would lie in Jordanian territory, and in order to determine Israel's own border, Allon suggested building a Jewish settlement adjacent to Hebron. David Ben-Gurion also considered that Hebron was the one sector of the conquered territories that should remain under Jewish control and be open to Jewish settlement. Apart from its symbolic message to the international community that Israel's rights in Hebron were, according to Jews, inalienable, settling Hebron also had theological significance in some quarters. For some, the capture of Hebron by Israel had unleashed a messianic fervor.

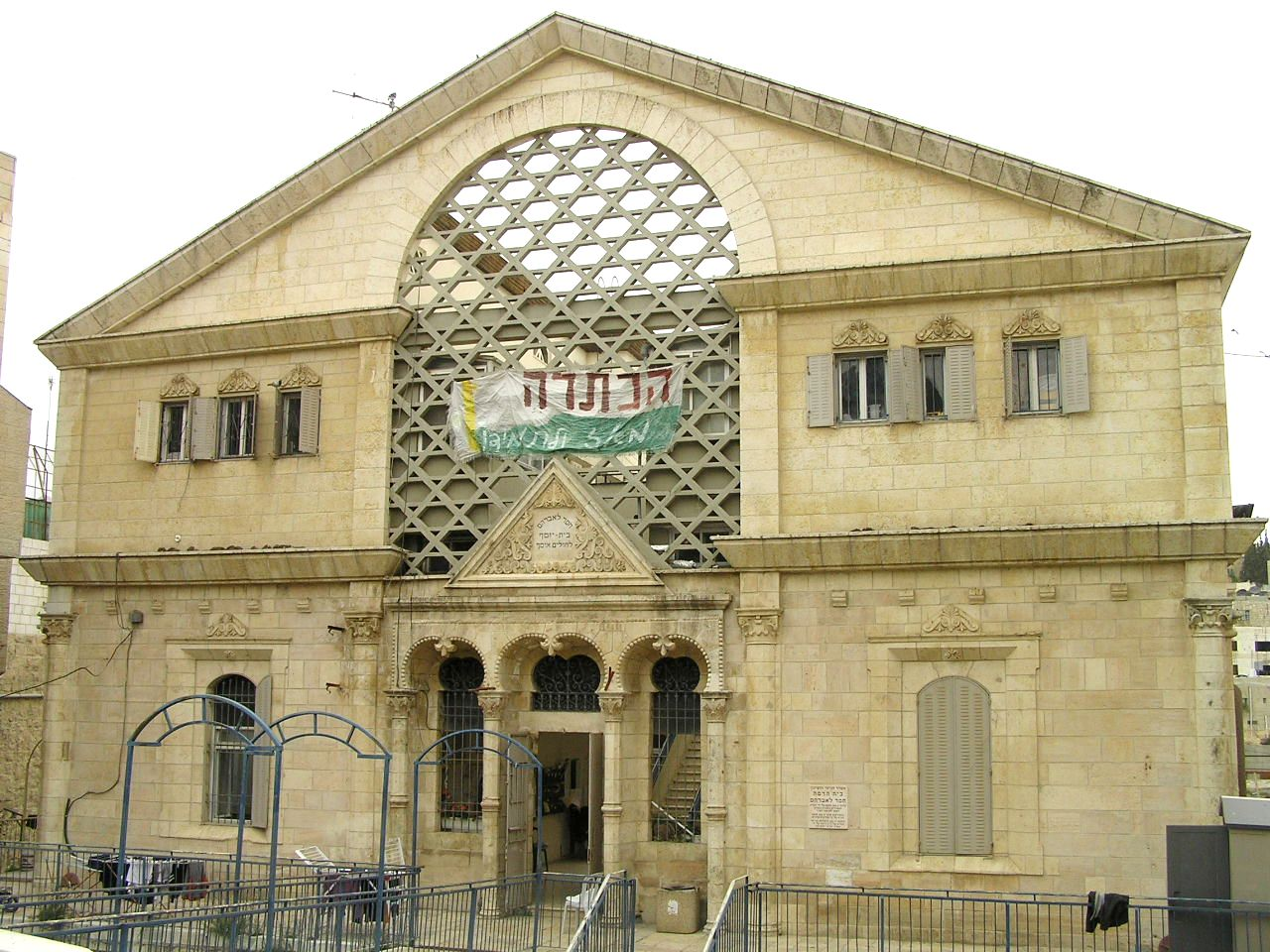
Constructed in 1893, this former Jewish clinic in central Hebron now forms part of an Israeli settlement.

Survivors and descendants of the prior community are mixed. Some support the project of Jewish redevelopment, others commend living in peace with Hebronite Arabs, while a third group recommend a full pullout. Descendants supporting the latter views have met with Palestinian leaders in Hebron. In 1997 one group of descendants dissociated themselves from the settlers by calling them an obstacle to peace. On 15 May 2006, a member of a group who is a direct descendant of the 1929 refugees urged the government to continue its support of Jewish settlement, and allow the return of eight families evacuated the previous January from homes they set up in emptied shops near the Avraham Avinu neighborhood. Beit HaShalom, established in 2007 under disputed circumstances, was under court orders permitting its forced evacuation. All the Jewish settlers were expelled on 3 December 2008.

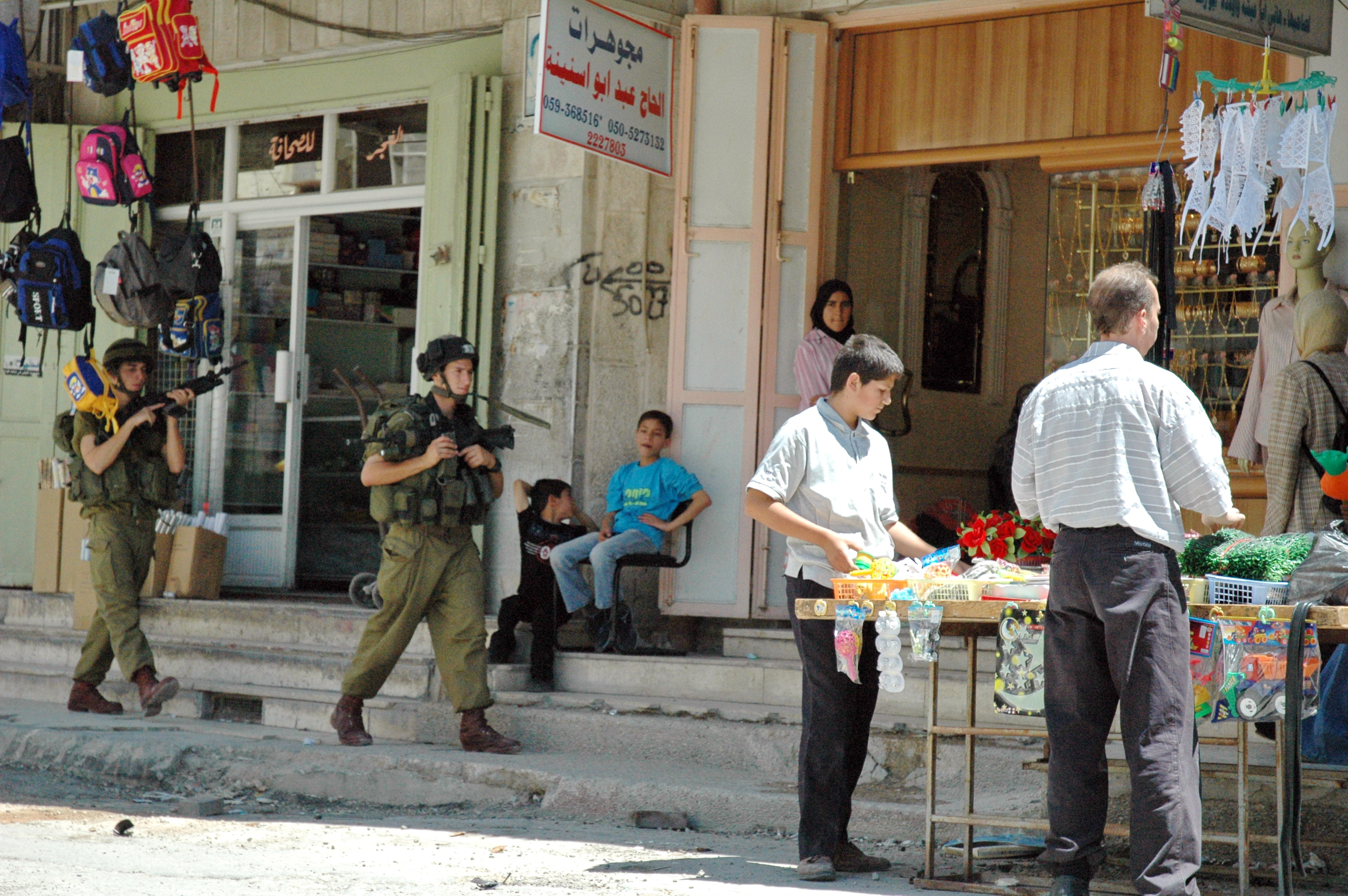
Israeli soldiers patrol an open-air market.

Immediately after the 1967 war, mayor al-Ja'bari had unsuccessfully promoted the creation of an autonomous Palestinian entity in the West Bank, and by 1972, he was advocating for a confederal arrangement with Jordan instead. al-Ja'bari nevertheless consistently fostered a conciliatory policy towards Israel. He was ousted by Fahad Qawasimi in the 1976 mayoral election, which marked a shift in support towards pro-PLO nationalist leaders. Supporters of Jewish settlement within Hebron see their program as the reclamation of an important heritage dating back to Biblical times, which was dispersed or, it is argued, stolen by Arabs after the massacre of 1929. The purpose of settlement is to return to the 'land of our forefathers', and the Hebron model of reclaiming sacred sites in Palestinian territories has pioneered a pattern for settlers in Bethlehem and Nablus. Many reports, foreign and Israeli, are sharply critical of the behavior of Hebronite settlers.

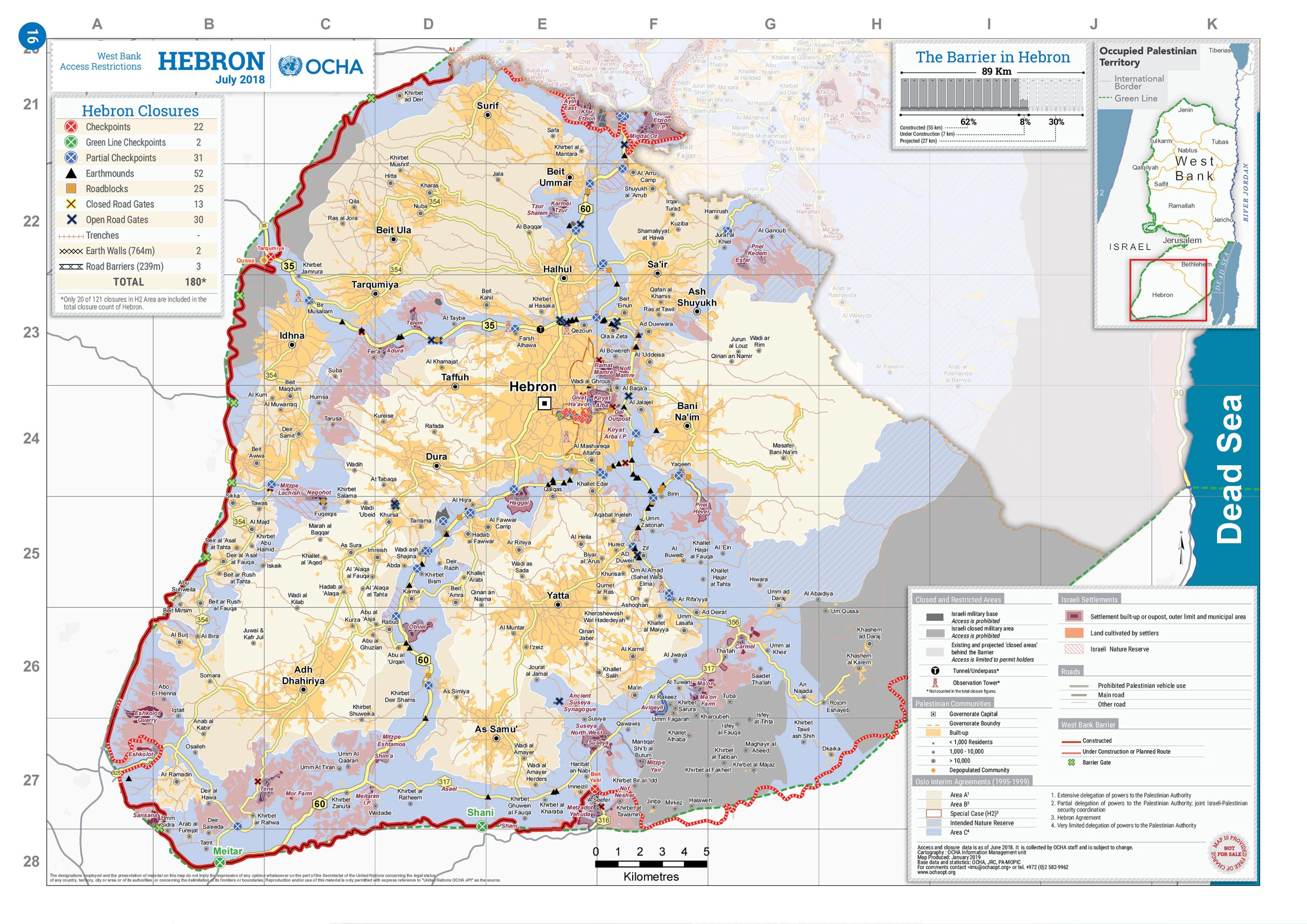
2018 United Nations map of the area, showing the Israeli occupation arrangements.

Sheik Farid Khader heads the Ja'bari tribe, consisting of some 35,000 people, which is considered one of the most important tribes in Hebron. For years, members of the Ja'bari tribe were the mayors of Hebron. Khader regularly meets with settlers and Israeli government officials and is a strong opponent of both the concept of Palestinian State and the Palestinian Authority itself. Khader believes that Jews and Arabs must learn to coexist. A violent episode occurred 2 May 1980, when an Al Fatah squad killed five yeshiva students and one other person on their way home from Sabbath prayer at the Tomb of the Patriarchs. The event provided a major motivation for settlers near Hebron to join the Jewish Underground.

In the 1980s Hebron, became the center of the Jewish Kach movement, a designated terrorist organization, whose first operations started there, and provided a model for similar behavior in other settlements. On 26 July 1983, Israeli settlers attacked the Islamic University and shot three people dead and injured over thirty others. The 1994 Shamgar Commission of Inquiry concluded that Israeli authorities had consistently failed to investigate or prosecute crimes committed by settlers against Palestinians. Hebron IDF commander Noam Tivon said that his foremost concern is to "ensure the security of the Jewish settlers" and that Israeli "soldiers have acted with the utmost restraint and have not initiated any shooting attacks or violence".

==== Oslo Accords ====
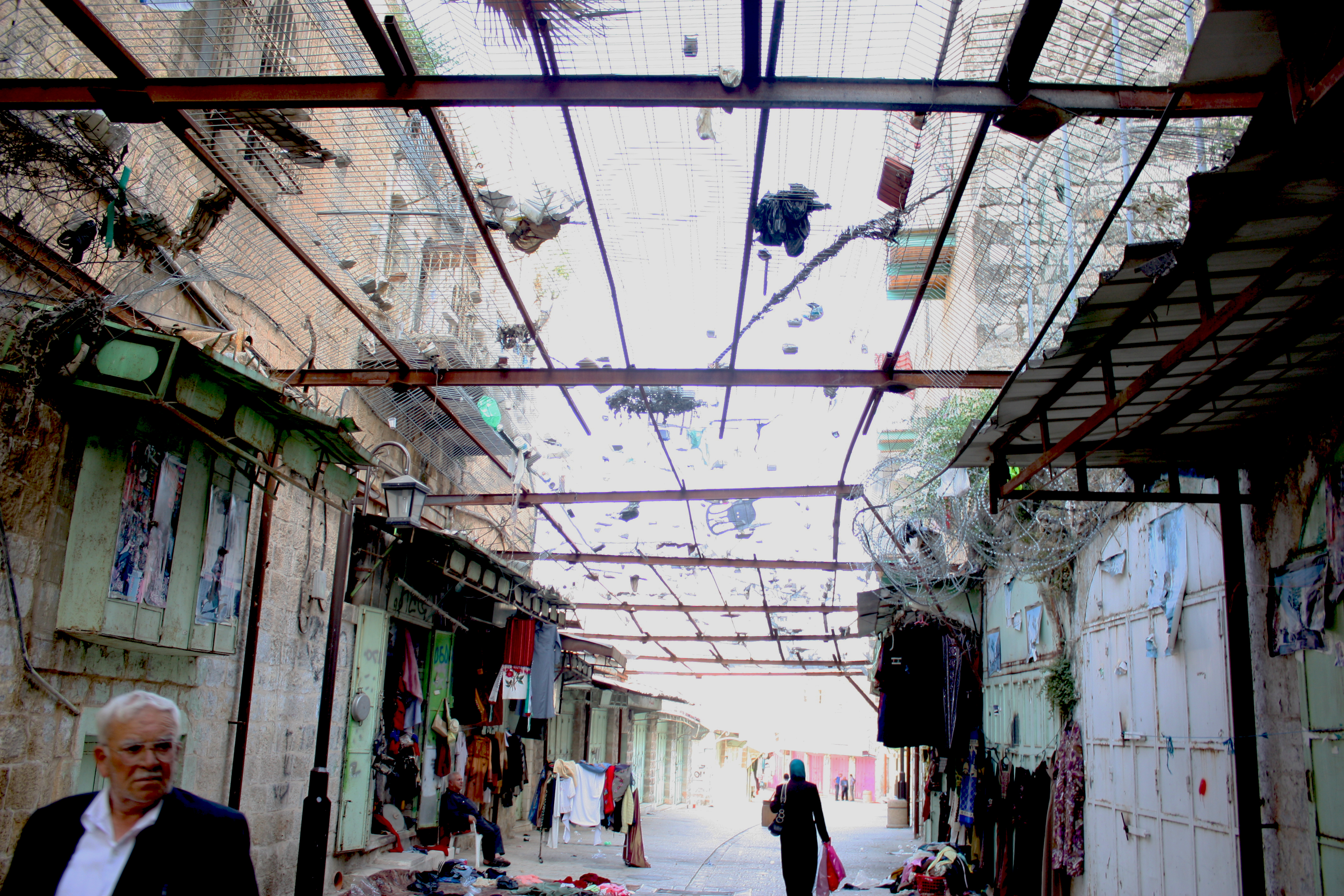
A net in the streets of the old city to protect Palestinians from the garbage thrown by Israeli settlers on the upper floors, June 2010

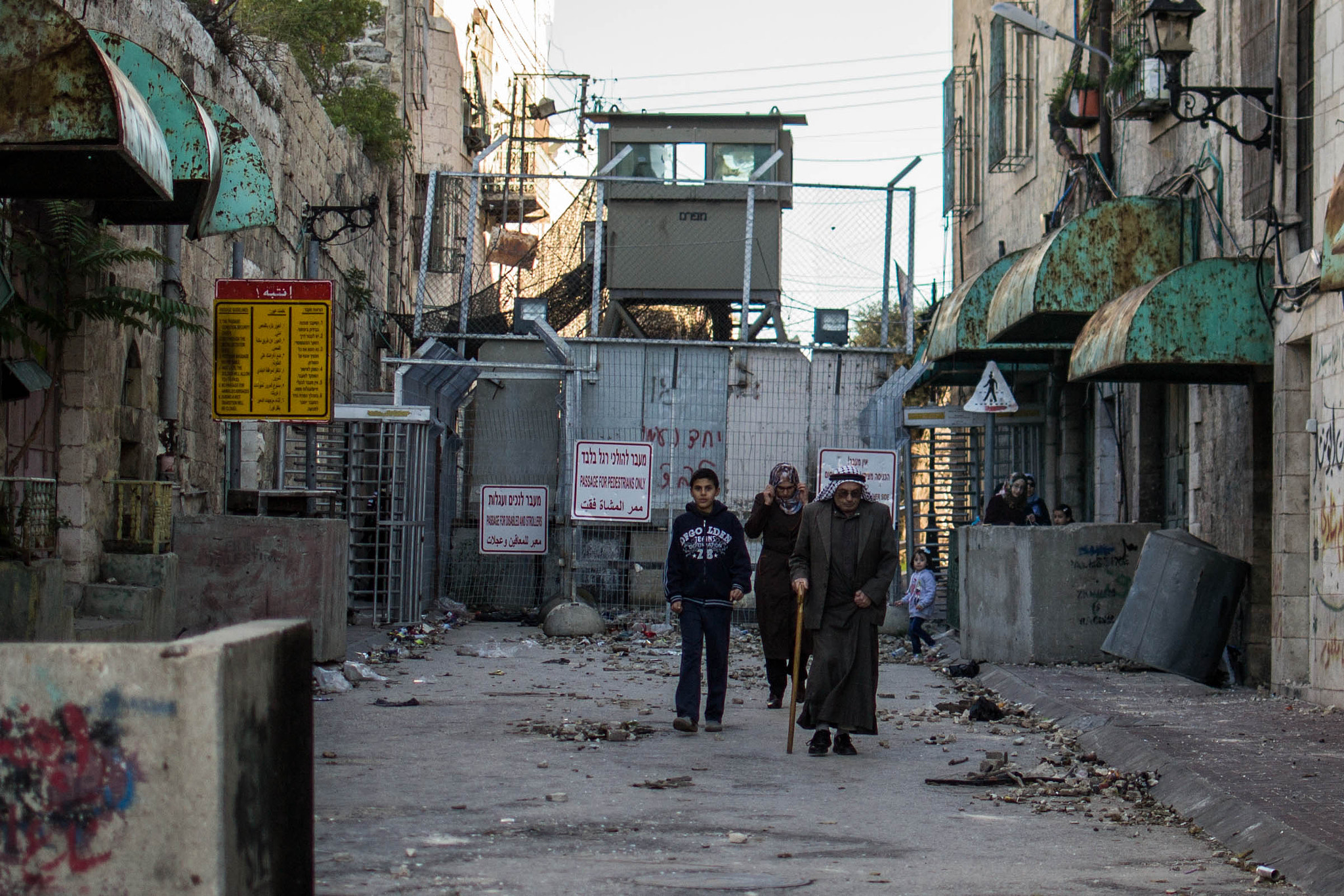
An Israeli checkpoint in Hebron in 2015

Hebron was the one city excluded from the interim agreement of September 1995 to restore rule over all Palestinian West Bank cities to the Palestinian Authority. IDF soldiers see their job as being to protect Israeli settlers from Palestinian residents, not to police the Israeli settlers. IDF soldiers are instructed to leave violent Israeli settlers for the police to deal with. Since The Oslo Agreement, violent episodes have been recurrent in the city. The Cave of the Patriarchs massacre took place on 25 February 1994, when Baruch Goldstein, an Israeli physician and resident of Kiryat Arba, opened fire on Muslims at prayer in the Cave of the Patriarchs, killing 29, and wounding 125 before the survivors overcame and killed him. Standing orders for Israeli soldiers on duty in Hebron disallowed them from firing on fellow Jews, even if they were shooting Arabs. This event was condemned by the Israeli Government, and the extreme right-wing Kach party was banned as a result. The Israeli government also tightened restrictions on the movement of Palestinians in H2, closed their vegetable and meat markets, and banned Palestinian cars on Al-Shuhada Street. The park near the Cave of the Patriarchs for recreation and barbecues is off-limits for Arab Hebronites. Following the 1995 Oslo Agreement and subsequent 1997 Hebron Agreement, Palestinian cities were placed under the exclusive jurisdiction of the Palestinian Authority, with the exception of Hebron, which was split into two sectors: H1 is controlled by the Palestinian Authority and H2 – which includes the Old City of Hebron – remained under the military control of Israel. Around 120,000 Palestinians live in H1, while around 30,000 Palestinians along with around 700 Israelis remain under Israeli military control in H2. As of 2009, a total of 86 Jewish families lived in Hebron. The IDF (Israel Defense Forces) may not enter H1 unless under Palestinian escort. Palestinians cannot approach areas where settlers live without special permits from the IDF. The Jewish settlement is widely considered to be illegal by the international community, although the Israeli government disputes this.

Over the period of the First Intifada and Second Intifada, the Jewish community was subjected to attacks by Palestinian militants, especially during the periods of the intifadas; which saw 3 fatal stabbings and 9 fatal shootings in between the first and second Intifada (0.9% of all fatalities in Israel and the West Bank) and 17 fatal shootings (9 soldiers and 8 settlers) and 2 fatalities from a bombing during the second Intifada, and thousands of rounds fired on it from the hills above the Abu-Sneina and Harat al-Sheikh neighborhoods. On 15 November 2002, 12 Israeli soldiers were killed (Hebron Brigade commander Colonel Dror Weinberg and two other officers, 6 soldiers and 3 members of the security unit of Kiryat Arba) in an ambush. Two Temporary International Presence in Hebron observers were killed by Palestinian gunmen in a shooting attack on the road to Hebron On 27 March 2001, a Palestinian sniper targeted and killed the Jewish baby Shalhevet Pass. The sniper was caught in 2022. Hebron is one of the three West Bank towns from which the majority of suicide bombers originate. In May 2003, three students of the Hebron Polytechnic University carried out three separate suicide attacks. In August 2003, in what both Islamic groups described as a retaliation, a 29-year-old preacher from Hebron, Raed Abdel-Hamed Mesk, broke a unilateral Palestinian ceasefire by killing 23 and injured over 130 in a bus bombing in Jerusalem. In 2007, the Palestinian population in H2 declined due to Israeli security measures such as extended curfews, strict restrictions on movement, the closure of Palestinian businesses and settler harassment. Palestinians are barred from using Al-Shuhada Street, a principal commercial thoroughfare that is locally nicknamed "Apartheid Street" as a result.

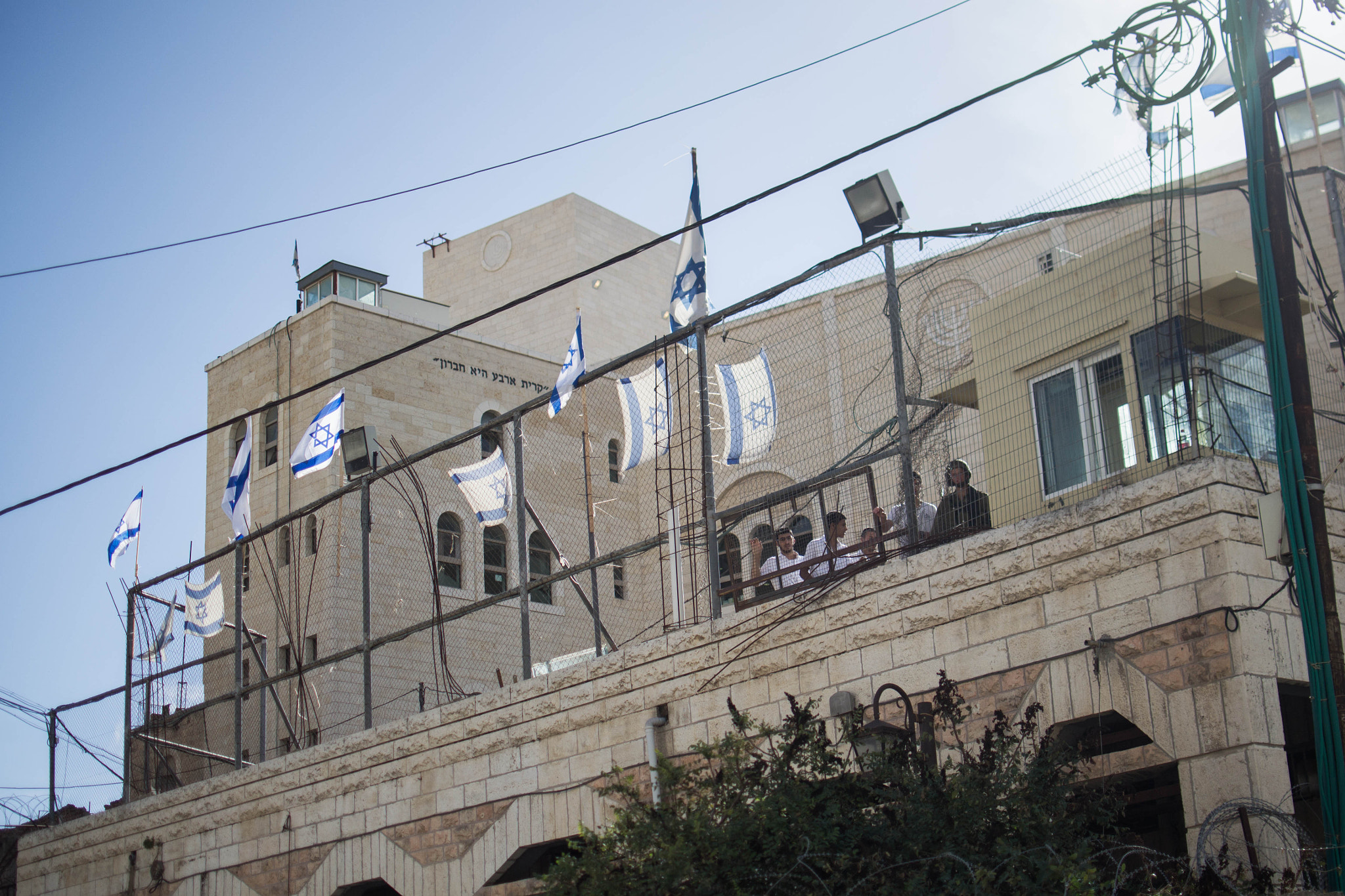
The Israeli settlement of Beit Romano, in the old town, 2015

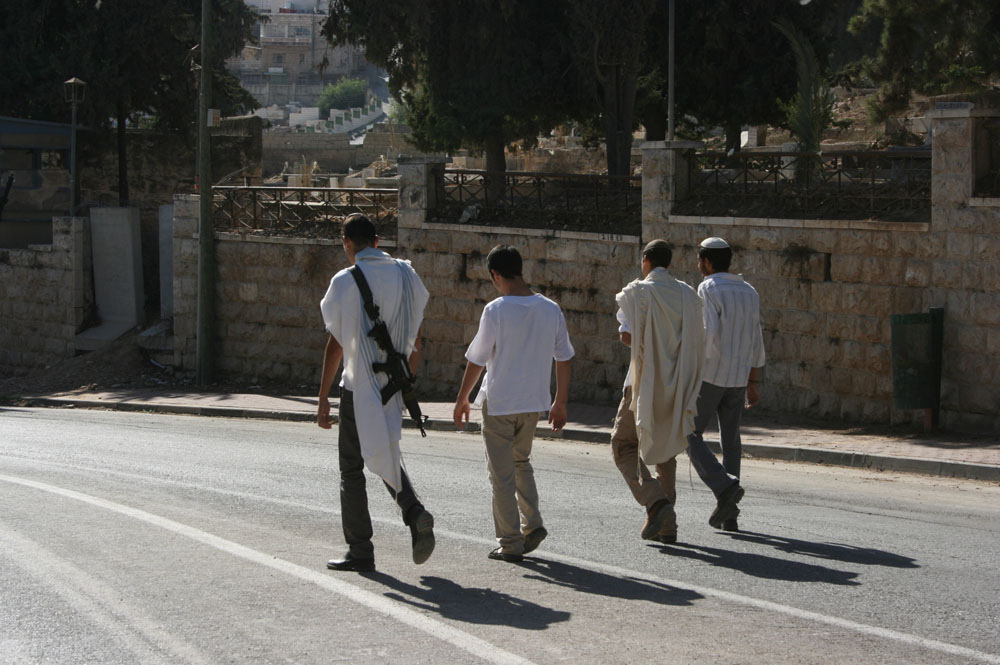
Armed Israeli settlers on Al-Shuhada Street, 6 November 2010

Israeli organization B'Tselem states that there have been "grave violations" of Palestinian human rights in Hebron because of the "presence of the settlers within the city". The organization cites regular incidents of "almost daily physical violence and property damage by settlers in the city", curfews and restrictions of movement that are "among the harshest in the Occupied Territories", and violence by Israeli border policemen and the IDF against Palestinians who live in the city's H2 sector. According to Human Rights Watch, Palestinian areas of Hebron are frequently subject to indiscriminate firing by the IDF, leading to many casualties. One former IDF soldier, with experience in policing Hebron, has testified to Breaking the Silence, that on the briefing wall of his unit a sign describing their mission aim was hung that read: "To disrupt the routine of the inhabitants of the neighbourhood." Hebron mayor Mustafa Abdel Nabi invited the Christian Peacemaker Teams to assist the local Palestinian community in opposition to what they describe as Israeli military occupation, collective punishment, settler harassment, home demolitions and land expropriation. In 2017, Temporary International Presence in Hebron (TIPH) issued a confidential report covering their 20 years of work in Hebron. The report, based in part on over 40,000 incidents reported during this period, stated that Israel violated international law in Hebron and has breached the rights of residents as established by the International Covenant on Civil and Political Rights. The report claimed that Israel violated Article 49 of the Fourth Geneva Convention, which prohibits the deportation of civilians from occupied territory. Israeli settlement in Hebron was also cited as a violation.

== Geography ==
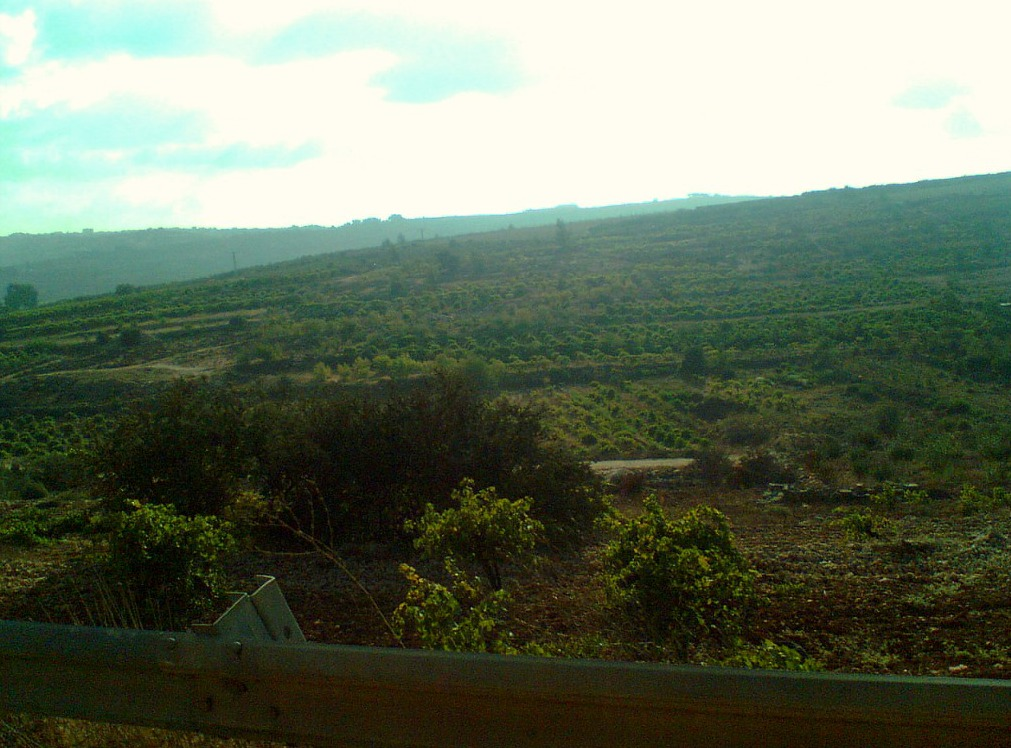
Grape farming in Hebron

Hebron is situated on the southern West Bank. Nestled in the Judaean Mountains, it lies 930 meters (3,050 ft) above sea level. Hebron is located 30 kilometers (19 mi) south of Jerusalem, 60.1 kilometers (37.3 mi) east of Gaza, 43 kilometers (27 mi) northeast of Beersheba and 68.4 kilometers (42.5 mi) southeast of Tel Aviv, both in Israel and 89.8 kilometers (55.8 mi) northeast of Amman, Jordan. The city is surrounded by Bani Na'im and Dura to the east, Halhul to the north, Taffuh to the west and Yatta to the south. The Israeli–controlled H2 region is located in the eastern region of the city.

It is one of the highest cities in the area and was, until the 19th century, considered the highest city in the Middle East. With the governorate and metropolitan area, it forms about 19% of the West Bank total area. The city is surrounded by several mountains and hills, including the Hebron Hills (Jabal al–Khalil) and Mount Nabi Yunis. The Mount Nabi Yunis, situated north of the city, is the highest point in Palestine, with an altitude of 1,030 meters (3,380 ft). While the Hebron Hills is southern part of the wider Judaean Mountains, which spreads throughout Israel and Palestine and have an altitude of 1,026 m (3,366 ft). The two larger settlements whose population exceeds 7000 sit on the hills overlooking the Hebron's eastern quarters – Kirayt Arba and Givat Harsina. Wadi al–Quff near Hebron is one of the largest natural reserves in Palestine. Located towards northeast of the city, it is surrounded by nearby towns and villages of Tarqumia, Halhoul, Beit Kahel and Beit Ola. The natural reserve covers up an area of 3.73 square kilometers (920 acres). Wadi al–Quff Natural reserve is home to some of the rare species of animals and plants.

Hebron is located on fertile mountainous area, making the city agriculturally rich, thus giving it a strategic importance. This is the reason for Hebron, today being a hub for cultivation of fruits and vineyards. The alternative sources of water network is cisterns. There are ten springs and three wells in the city. The water of springs and wells are not currently used. The Hebron River (Wadi al–Khalil), known as Nahal Hebron in Hebrew located along the region of Judea and Negev, is one of the water sources for the city. Currently the river is polluted, mainly due to the generation of waste, mostly by the industrial areas, situated on the city's east and south.

=== Climate ===
The climate in Hebron is temperate and the mean year-round temperature ranges between 15 and 16° (an average of 7° in winter and 21° in summer). Annual precipitations average around 502 mm. Hebron has a Mediterranean, hot summer climate (Classification: Csa). The city's yearly temperature is 22.74 °C (72.93 °F) and it is 0.14% higher than Palestine's averages. It typically receives about 15.72 millimeters (0.62 inches) of precipitation and has 39.47 rainy days (10.81% of the time) annually, during January and February.

Climate data for Hebron, Palestine (2007-2018)
Month	Jan	Feb	Mar	Apr	May	Jun	Jul	Aug	Sep	Oct	Nov	Dec	Year
Record high °C (°F)	24.5 (76.1)	25.0 (77.0)	31.0 (87.8)	34.0 (93.2)	36.0 (96.8)	37.6 (99.7)	36.8 (98.2)	39.0 (102.2)	36.0 (96.8)	34.5 (94.1)	29.5 (85.1)	26.6 (79.9)	39.0 (102.2)
Mean daily maximum °C (°F)	11.4 (52.5)	13.2 (55.8)	16.5 (61.7)	20.7 (69.3)	25.0 (77.0)	27.5 (81.5)	29.2 (84.6)	29.4 (84.9)	27.8 (82.0)	24.4 (75.9)	20.0 (68.0)	14.9 (58.8)	21.7 (71.0)
Daily mean °C (°F)	8.3 (46.9)	10.0 (50.0)	12.3 (54.1)	15.8 (60.4)	19.6 (67.3)	22.0 (71.6)	23.7 (74.7)	23.9 (75.0)	22.1 (71.8)	19.5 (67.1)	14.8 (58.6)	10.7 (51.3)	16.9 (62.4)
Mean daily minimum °C (°F)	5.4 (41.7)	6.6 (43.9)	8.6 (47.5)	11.4 (52.5)	15.3 (59.5)	17.5 (63.5)	19.2 (66.6)	19.6 (67.3)	17.8 (64.0)	15.9 (60.6)	11.3 (52.3)	7.0 (44.6)	13.0 (55.3)
Record low °C (°F)	−3.8 (25.2)	−2.0 (28.4)	−1.0 (30.2)	3.0 (37.4)	6.6 (43.9)	11.0 (51.8)	14.0 (57.2)	15.0 (59.0)	12.0 (53.6)	9.6 (49.3)	4.0 (39.2)	−2.5 (27.5)	−3.8 (25.2)
Average rainfall mm (inches)	138.2 (5.44)	108.6 (4.28)	49.9 (1.96)	15.4 (0.61)	4.7 (0.19)	0.0 (0.0)	0.0 (0.0)	0.0 (0.0)	1.4 (0.06)	18.8 (0.74)	40.1 (1.58)	95.1 (3.74)	472.0 (18.58)
Average rainy days	10.0	9.0	5.2	3.5	1.3	0.0	0.0	0.0	0.7	2.6	5.4	7.7	45.4
Average relative humidity (%)	73.0	69.5	63.9	56.3	52.4	55.0	56.5	60.6	68.0	66.6	67.8	71.2	63.4
Mean monthly sunshine hours	164.3	156.7	214.5	261.3	313.1	337.9	363.8	346.9	279.3	243.2	186.5	165.7	3,033.2
Percentage possible sunshine	52	51	59	68	74	80	85	85	77	70	60	53	69
Source: Palestinian Meteorological Department

=== Urban development ===
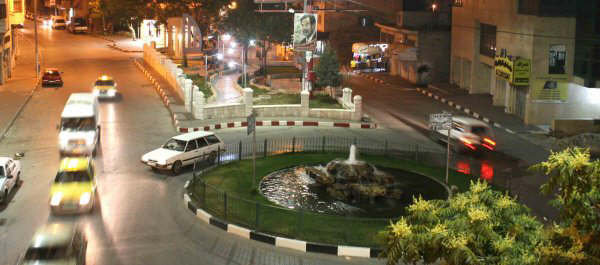
King Faisal Street in Hebron was named in commemoration of Shah Faisal, the king of Saudi Arabia from 1964 to 1975

Historically, the city consisted of four densely populated quarters: the suq and Harat al-Masharqa adjacent to the Ibrahimi Mosque, the Silk Merchant Quarter (Haret Kheitun) to the south and the Sheikh Quarter (Haret al-Sheikh) to the north. It is believed the basic urban structure of the city had been established by the Mamluk period, during which time the city also had Jewish, Christian and Kurdish quarters. In the mid 19th-century, Hebron was still divided into four quarters, but the Christian quarter had disappeared. The sections included the ancient quarter surrounding the Cave of Machpelah, the Haret Kheitun (the Jewish Quarter, Haret el-Yahud), the Haret el-Sheikh and the Druze Quarter. As Hebron's population gradually increased, inhabitants preferred to build upwards rather than leave the safety of their neighborhoods. By the 1880s, better security provided by the Ottoman authorities allowed the town to expand and a new commercial center, Bab el-Zawiye, emerged. As development continued, new spacious and taller structures were built to the north-west. In 1918, the town consisted of dense clusters of residential dwellings along the valley, rising onto the slopes above it. By the 1920s, the town was made up of seven quarters: el-Sheikh and Bab el-Zawiye to the west, el-Kazzazin, el-Akkabi and el-Haram in the center, el-Musharika to the south and el-Kheitun in the east. Urban sprawl had spread onto the surrounding hills by 1945.

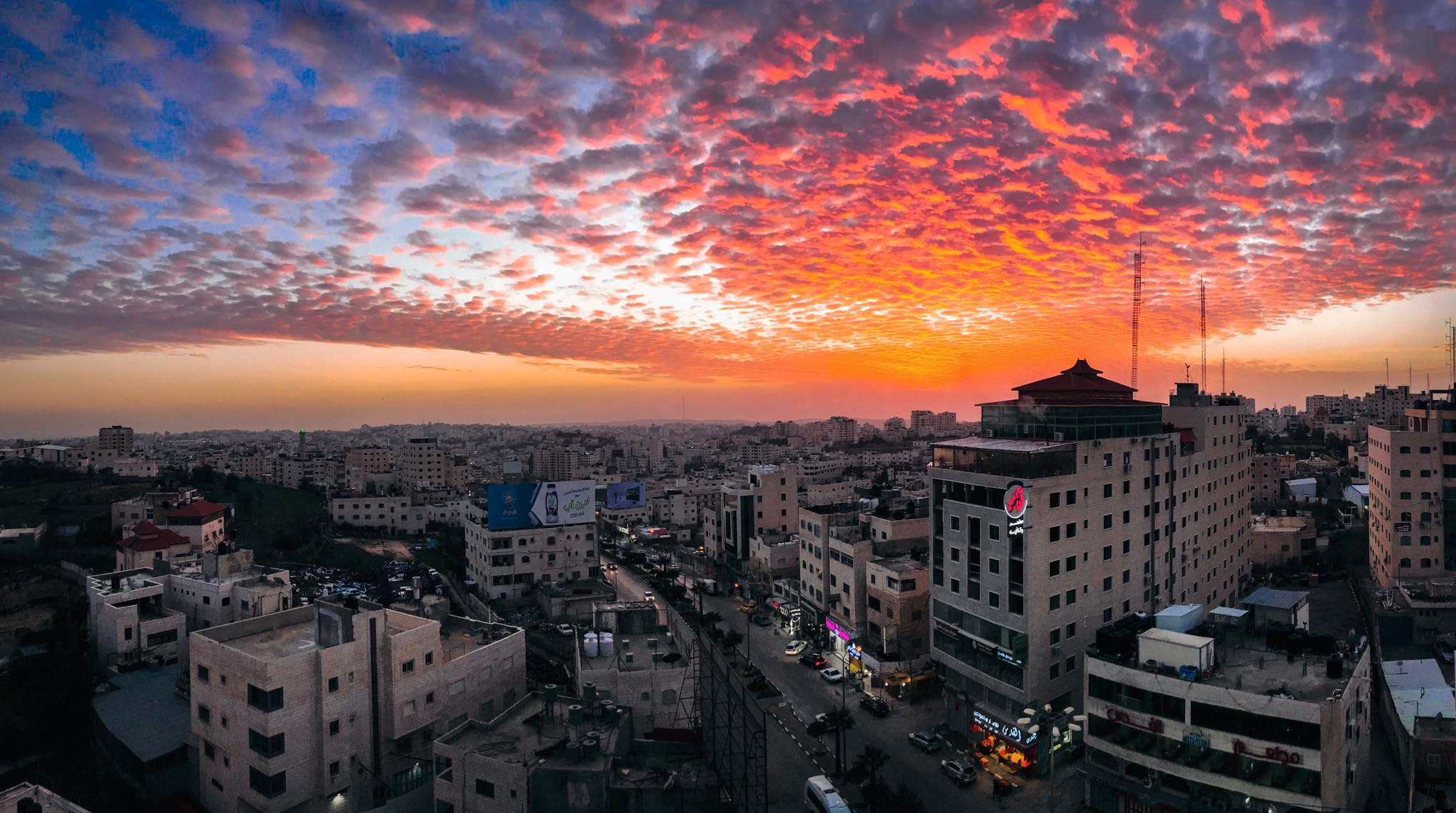
Sunset in the sky of Hebron Ras al-Jura

The large population increase under Jordanian rule resulted in about 1,800 new houses being built, most of them along the Hebron-Jerusalem highway, stretching northwards for over 3 miles (5 km) at a depth of 600 ft (200m) either way. Some 500 houses were built elsewhere on surrounding rural land. There was less development to the south-east, where housing units extended along the valley for about 1 mile (1.5 km). In 1971, with the assistance of the Israeli and Jordanian governments, the Hebron University, an Islamic university, was founded. In an attempt to enhance the view of the Ibrahami Mosque, Jordan demolished whole blocks of ancient houses opposite its entrance, which also resulted in improved access to the historic site. The Jordanians also demolished the old synagogue located in the el-Kazzazin Quarter. In 1976, Israel recovered the site, which had been converted into an animal pen, and by 1989, a settler courtyard had been established there.

Today, the area along the north–south axis to the east comprises the modern city of Hebron (also called Upper Hebron, Khalil Foq). It was established towards the end of the Ottoman period, its inhabitants being upper and middle class Hebronites who moved there from the crowded old city, Balde al-Qadime (also called Lower Hebron, Khalil Takht). The northern part of Upper Hebron includes some up-scale residential districts and also houses the Hebron University, private hospitals and the only two luxury hotels in the city. The main commercial artery of the city is located here, situated along the Jerusalem Road, and includes modern multi-storey shopping malls. Also in this area are villas and apartment complexes built on the krum, rural lands and vineyards, which used to function as recreation areas during the summer months until the early Jordanian period. The southern part is where the working-class neighborhoods are located, along with large industrial zones and the Hebron Polytechnic University. The main municipal and governmental buildings are located in the center of the city. This area includes high-rise concrete and glass developments and also some distinct Ottoman era one-storey family houses, adorned with arched entrances, decorative motifs and ironwork. Hebron's domestic appliance and textile markets are located here along two parallel roads that lead to the entrance of the old city. Many of these have been relocated from the old commercial center of the city, known as the vegetable market (hesbe), which was closed down by the Israeli military during the 1990s. The vegetable market is now located in the square of Bab el-Zawiye.

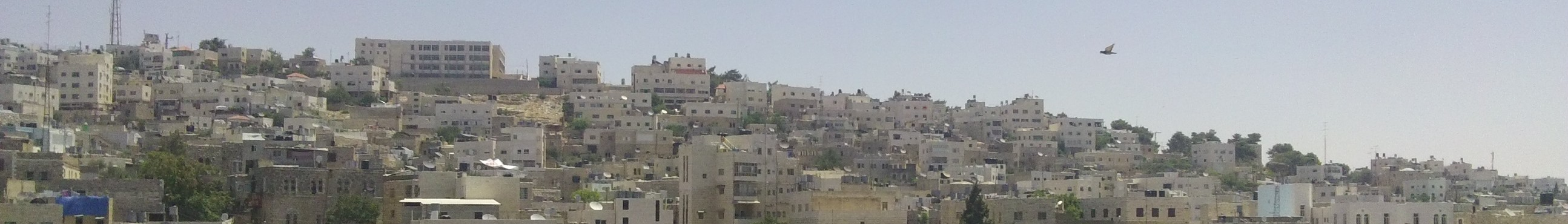
Panoramic view of residential area of Hebron

== Demographics ==
Historical population
Year	Pop.	±%
1838	10,000	—
1874	17,000	+70.0%
1922	16,577	−2.5%
1945	24,400	+47.2%
1961	37,868	+55.2%
1997	119,093	+214.5%
2007	163,146	+37.0%
2017	201,063	+23.2%

Hebron has, historically, been an Arab city but a small Jewish community has existed since the 16th century, encouraged to settle there by the Ottoman authorities following the expulsion of Jews from Spain. In 1820, it was reported that there were about 1,000 Jews in Hebron. In 1838, the total population was estimated at 10,000, including an estimated 1,500 taxable Muslim households, and to 41 Jewish taxpayers. Taxpayers consisted here of male heads of households who owned even a very small shop or piece of land. Two hundred Jews and one Christian household were under 'European protections'. In 1842, it was estimated that about 400 Arab and 120 Jewish families lived in Hebron, the Jews having been diminished in number following the destruction of 1834. Its population stood at 16,577 in 1922 of which 16,074 (97%) were Muslim, 430 (2.5%) were Jewish, and 73 (0.4%) were Christian.

The Jewish community was expelled from the city following the massacre of nearly 70 Jews in 1929. However, since Israel gained control of the West Bank in 1967, Hebron and eastern Jerusalem have been the only cities in the region to receive Jewish settlement.

Hebron had a population of 201,063 Palestinians in 2017, and seven hundred Jewish settlers concentrated on the outskirts of its Old City. Roughly 20% of the city, including 35,000 Palestinians, under Israeli military administration, lives in the region of H2 Hebron. The surrounding area forms the Hebron metropolitan area, with an estimated population of around 782,227 as of 2021. It is third largest metropolitan area in Palestine, after Gaza and Jerusalem.

Hebron is also home to several ethnic minority and foreign diaspora communities. Kurds have been living in the city since Saladin's conquest of Palestine. Along with Jerusalem and Gaza, the city is also home to Palestinians of Kurdish descent. Nearly a third of the population of Hebron is considered to be of Kurdish background. The Kurdish Quarter, known as Harat al-Akrad, still exists today. Hebron is also home to a small Samaritan community, after Nablus.

== Economy ==
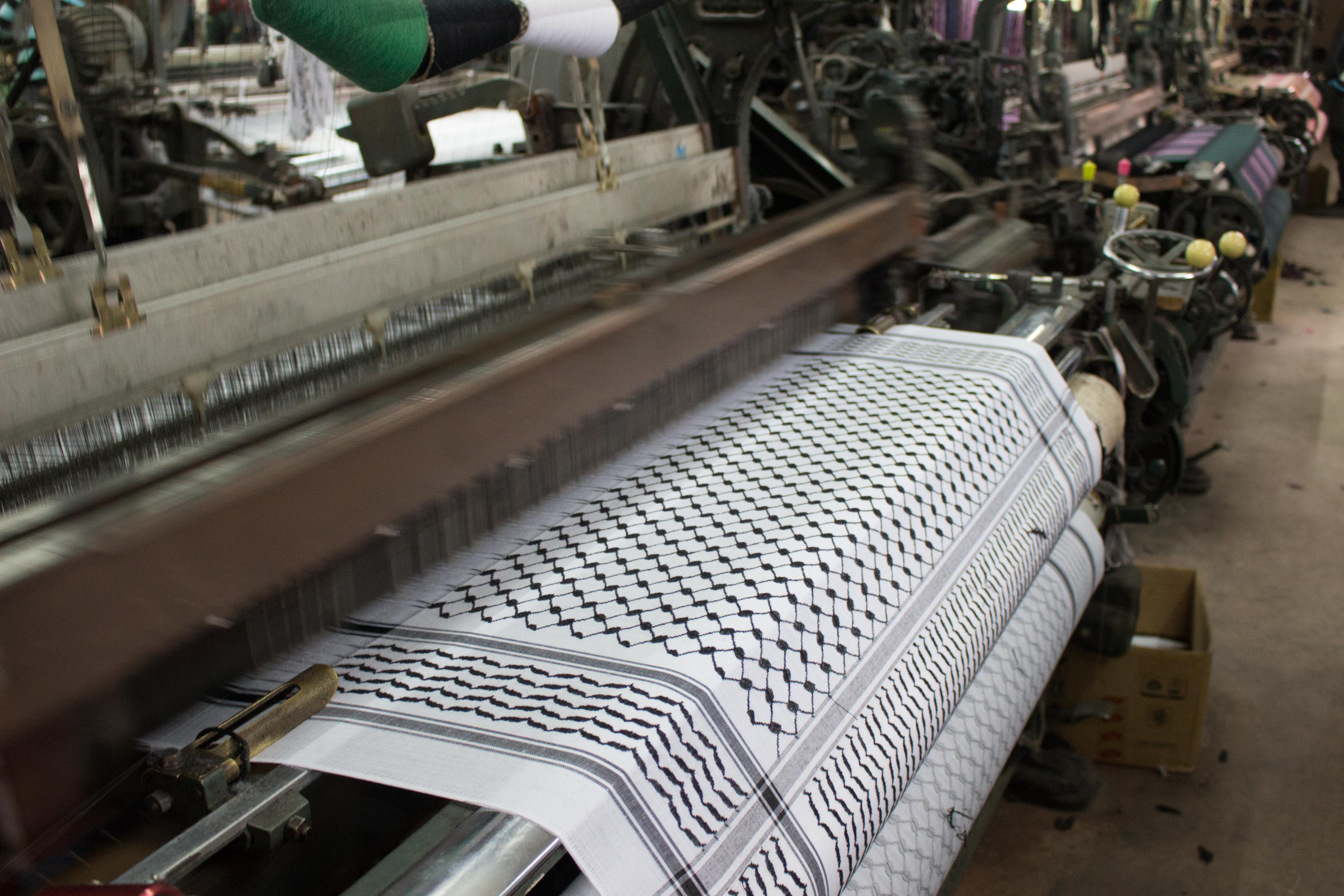
A loom at work making keffiyeh at the Hirbawi factory in Hebron.

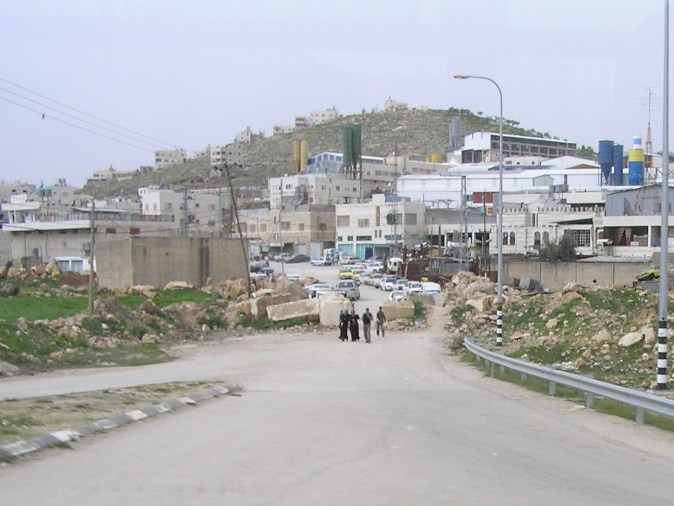
Industrial area of Hebron

Hebron is a leading commercial and industrial center in the Levantine region. The presence of minerals and resources in surroundings have increased the city's value. It emerged as in important trade hub in the West Bank. Hebron is most productive region in the country after Jerusalem–Bethlehem–Ramallah area. The H1 Area, which is under control of Palestinian Authority have been a large contributor to the city's economy. Despite having tense relations, Israelis and Palestinians have strong trade relations in Hebron. The city is popular for its ceramics and glass industry.

It is the source of 60% of stone and marble resources in the West Bank. 33% of the Palestine's GNP is from Hebron, including 60% of the jewelry industry and jewelry production, 28% of the output in the agricultural sector and 75% of the leather and shoe industry. Most agricultural products from Palestinian controlled Hebron are sent to Israel. Trade volume between Israel and the Palestine reaches $30 billion annually and the city trades with China as well. The minimum wage is 50 NIS per day versus an average of 30 NIS per day in other Palestinian areas.

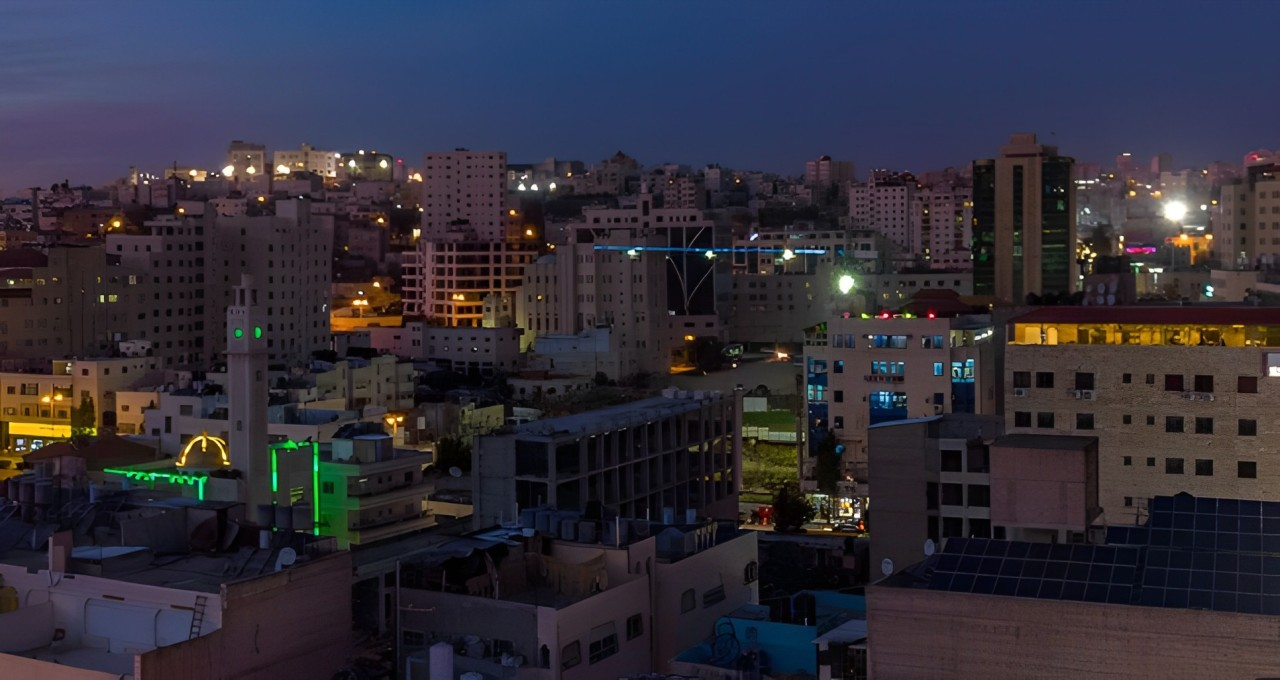
Ein Sarah Street, Hebron Central Business District at night

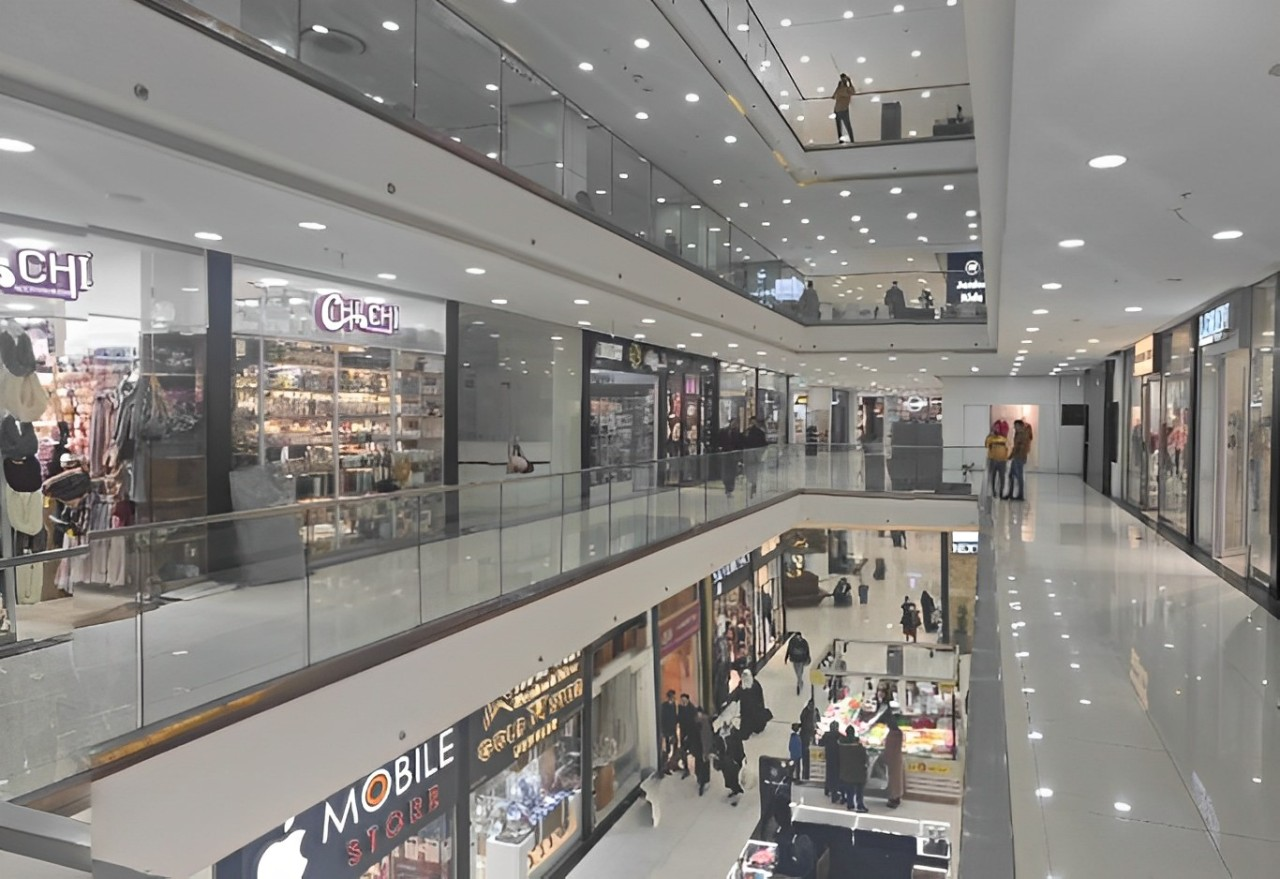
Inside the Hebron City Center Mall

From the 1970s to the early 1990s, a third of those who lived in the city worked in the shoe industry. According to the shoe factory owner Tareq Abu Felat, the number reached least 35,000 people and there were more than 1,000 workshops around the city. Statistics from the Chamber of Commerce in Hebron put the figure at 40,000 people employed in 1,200 shoe businesses. However, the 1993 Oslo Accords and 1994 Paris Protocol between Israel and the PLO made it possible to mass import Chinese goods as the Palestinian National Authority, which was created after the Oslo Accords, did not regulate it. They later put import taxes but the Abu Felat, who also is the Palestinian Federation of Leather Industries's chairman, said more is still needed. The Palestinian government decided to impose an additional tax of 35% on products from China from April 2013. Ninety percent of the shoes in Palestine are now estimated to come from China, which Palestinian industry workers say are of much lower quality but also much cheaper, and the Chinese are more aesthetic. Another factor contributing to the decline of the local industry is Israeli restrictions on Palestinian exports. Today, there are less than 300 workshops in the shoe industry, who only run part-time, and they employ around 3,000–4,000 people. More than 50% of the shoes are exported to Israel, where consumers have a better economy. Less than 25% goes to the Palestinian market, with some going to Jordan, Saudi Arabia and other Arab countries.

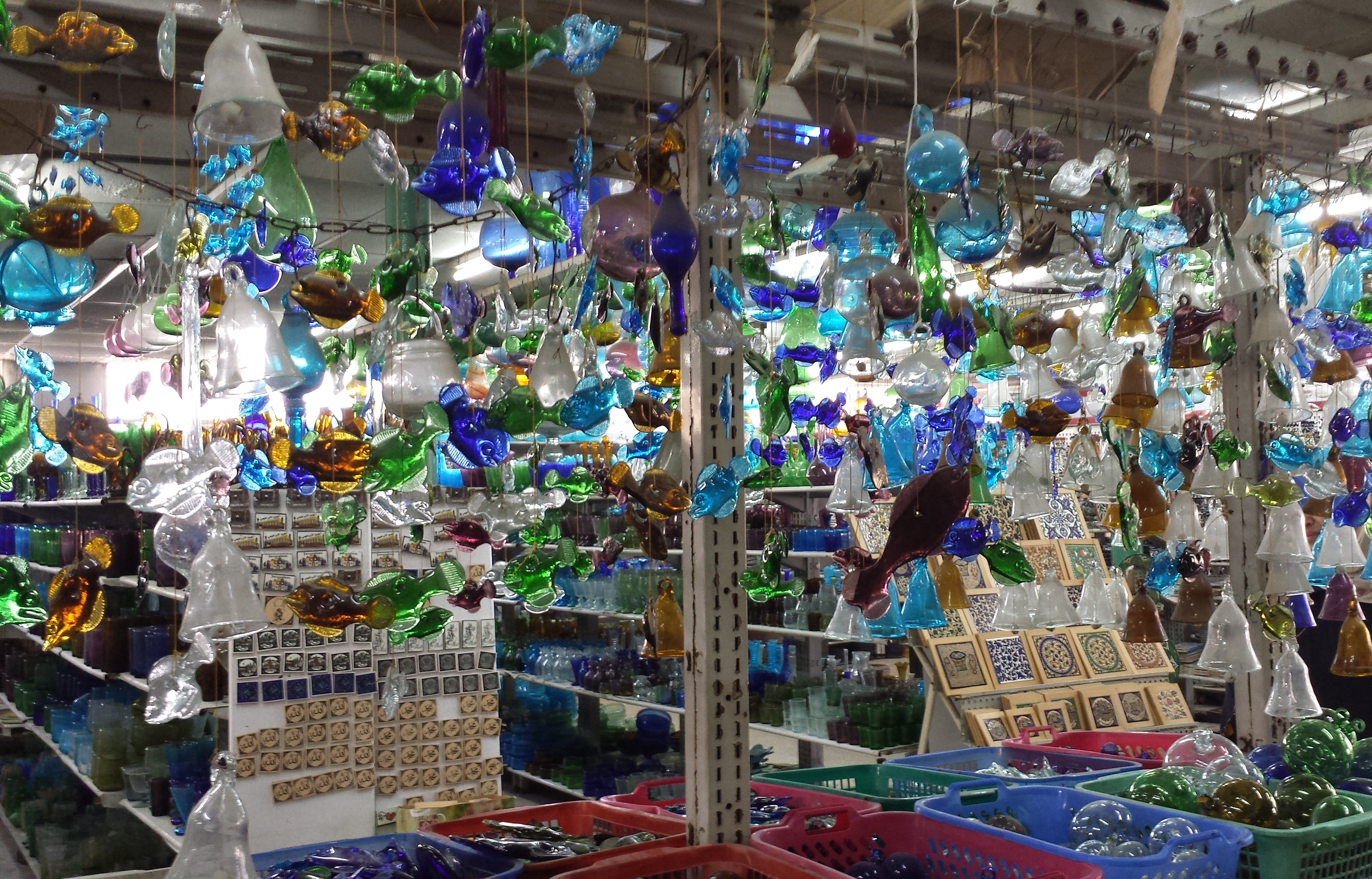
Hebron glass in a market

The most advanced printing press in the Middle East is in Hebron. Hebron is major source of import goods to Israel. Mattresses manufactured in Hebron are exported to Israeli markets in Tel Aviv, Beersheba and Haifa. Around 17,000 factories and workshops are located throughout the Area H1. Historically, the traditional glass industry is popular in Hebron. A new industrial city has been built in Tarqumiyah, which houses more than 140 factories. Royal Industrial Trading operates a pipe manufacturing plant in Hebron, which is spread across an area of 40,000 square meters (9.9 acres) and employs over 650 people. In 2021, an electronic recycling factory was opened in Idhna and operates to this day. The European Union and the World Bank proposed to construct a regional water treatment plant, which will treat existing sewage stream coming from 80% of the city. The city is a hub for the jewelry industry and houses approximately 70 jewelry factories employing over 1500 workers.

Super Nimer company manufactures sanitary ware products and water network from its factory, whose area ranges from 30,000 square meters (7.4 acres) to 45,000 square meters (11 acres). Opened in 2004, Super Tiger operates a factory spread across an area of 7 acres (28,000 m^{2}). During the COVID-19 pandemic in the State of Palestine, Hebron rapidly transformed into a medical supplies manufacturing hub, with numerous factories installing and commissioning new production lines for the product and was approved by the Ministry of National Economy.

Grapes are one of the cities primary exports, in 2013, the Palestinian ministry of agriculture reported an export of 25,000 tons of grapes, as well as 3,000 tons of grape leaves for making stuffed leaves, totalling half the countries production and generating 10 million NIS in revenue.

== Political status ==
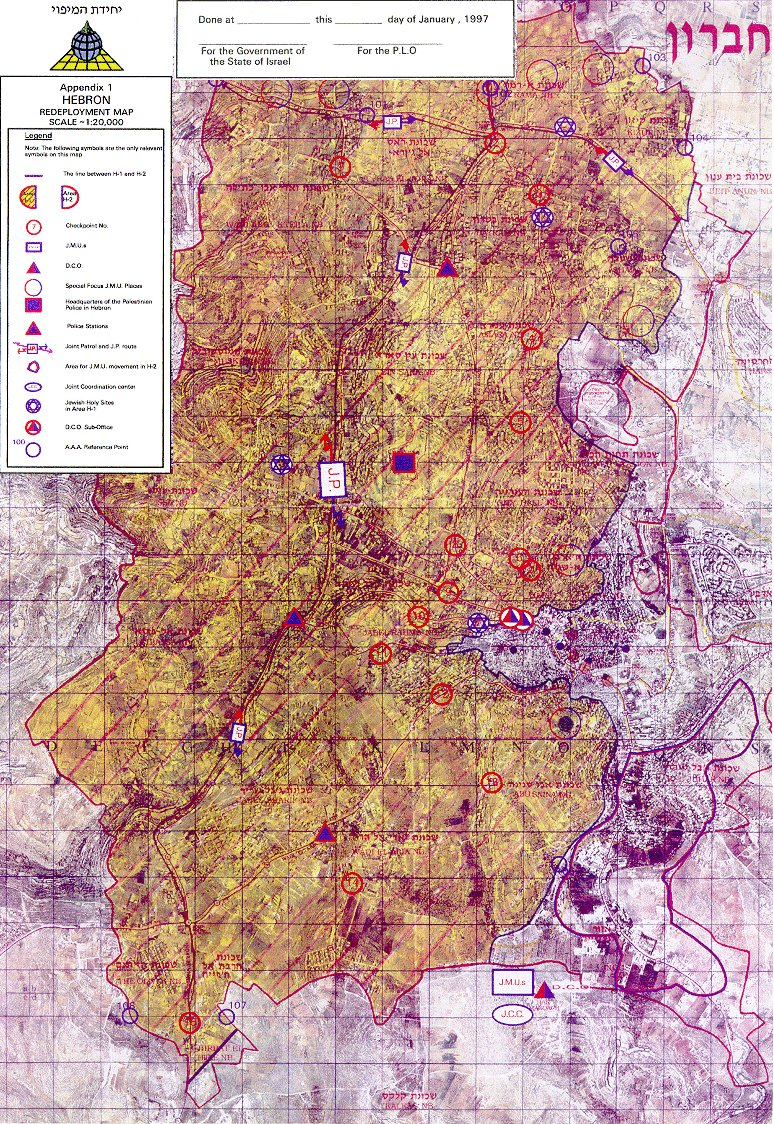
Official 1997 agreement map of Palestinian controlled H1 and Israeli controlled H2.

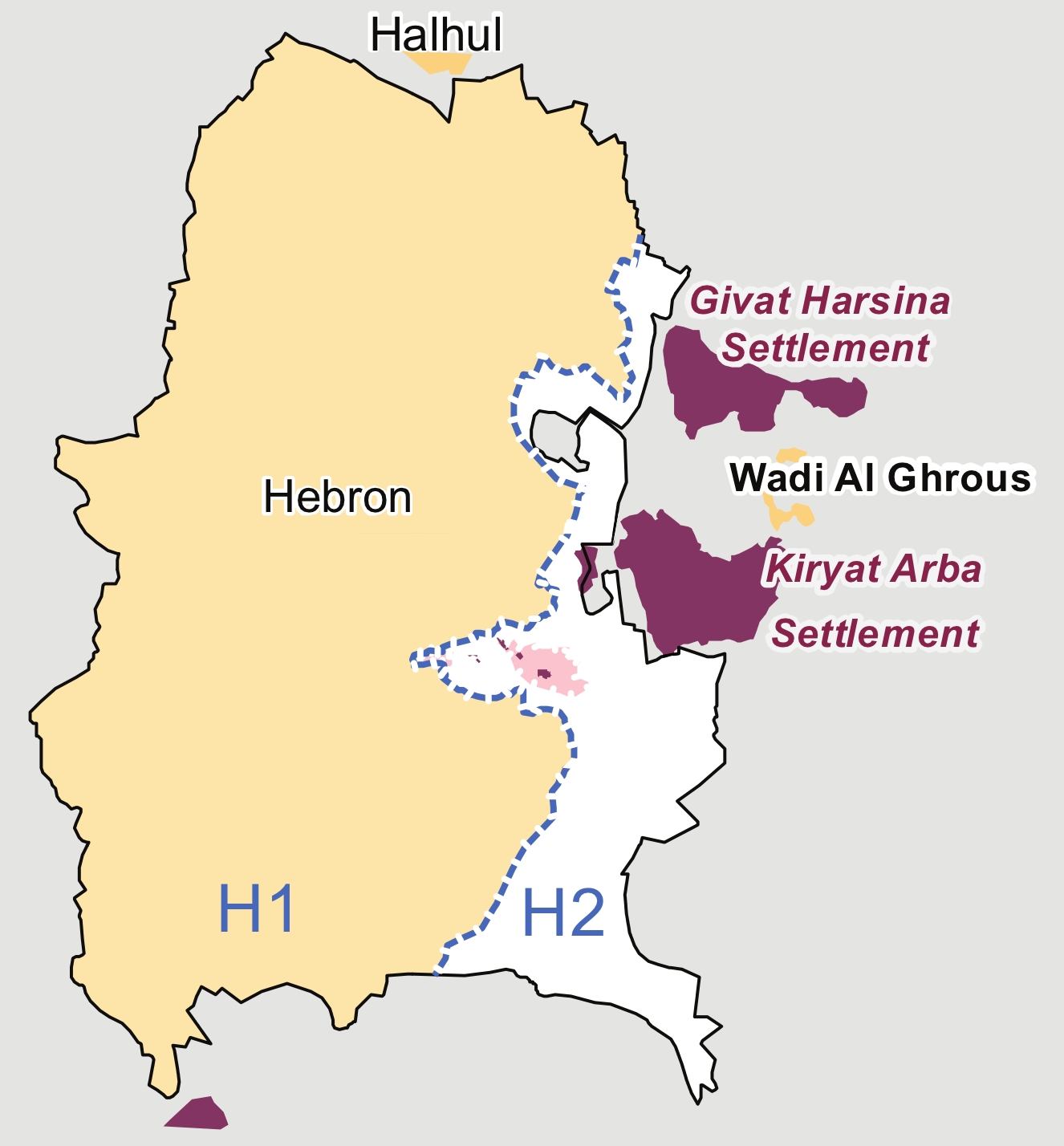
Illustration showing areas H1 and H2 and adjacent Israeli settlements

1997 Protocol Concerning the Redeployment in Hebron

Under the United Nations Partition Plan for Palestine passed by the UN in 1947, Hebron was envisaged to become part of an Arab state. While the Jewish leaders accepted the partition plan, the Arab leadership (the Arab Higher Committee in Palestine and the Arab League) rejected it, opposing any partition. The aftermath of the 1948 war saw the city occupied and later unilaterally annexed by the kingdom of Jordan in a move supported by local Hebron officials. Following the Six-Day War of 1967, Israel occupied Hebron. In 1997, in accordance with the Hebron Agreement, Israel withdrew from 80 percent of Hebron, which was handed over to the Palestinian Authority. Palestinian police would assume responsibilities in Area H1 and Israel would retain control in Area H2.

An international unarmed observer force—the Temporary International Presence in Hebron (TIPH) was subsequently established to help the normalization of the situation and to maintain a buffer between the Palestinian Arab population of the city and the Jewish population residing in their enclave in the old city. The TIPH operates with the permission of the Israeli government, meeting regularly with the Israeli army and the Israeli Civil Administration, and is granted free access throughout the city. In 2018, the TIPH came under criticism in Israel due to incidents where an employee was, according to the Israeli police, filmed puncturing the tires of the car of an Israeli settler, and another instance where an observer was deported after slapping a settler boy.

The post-1967 settlement in Hebron was driven by theological doctrines from the Mercaz HaRav Kook, which consider the Land of Israel and its people as holy, and believe that the messianic Age of Redemption has arrived. Hebron holds special significance in this narrative, with traditions linking it to Abraham, King David, and the entrance to the Garden of Eden. Settling in Hebron is seen as a right and duty, a favor to the world, and an example of being "a light unto the nations" (Or la-Goyim). This viewpoint has resulted in numerous violent clashes with Palestinians, which some settlers see as contributing to the messianic process.

=== Occupation and settlements ===
In 1968, Rabbi Moshe Levinger and a group of Israelis, disguised as tourists, rented the main hotel in Hebron and refused to leave. The government initially wanted to evacuate the settlers but eventually allowed them to relocate to a nearby military base, which became the settlement of Kiryat Arba. After lobbying efforts, the settlement gained support from some Israeli leaders. Over time, the settlement expanded with the outpost Givat Ha'avot. The operation was planned and financed by the Movement for Greater Israel. In 2011, the Israeli Supreme Court ruled that Jews have no right to properties they possessed in places like Hebron before 1948 and are not entitled to compensation for their losses. Originally named Hesed l'Avraham, Beit Hadassah was constructed in 1893 with donations of Baghdadi Jewish families and was the only modern medical facility in Hebron. In 1909, it was renamed after Hadassah Women's Zionist Organization of America, which took responsibility for the medical staff and provided free medical care to all. In 1979, a group of 15 settler mothers and their 35 children squatted in the Dabouia building in Hebron, exploiting the government's indecision during negotiations with Egypt. Led by Miriam Levinger, they established a bridgehead for Jewish resettlement and created conflict with Arab shopkeepers. A retaliatory attack by a Palestinian group resulted in the death of six yeshiva students. Despite appeals to the Israeli Supreme Court, the settlers remained. The following year, the government legitimized residency in Hebron and expelled the elected mayor. This pattern of settlement followed by hostilities with Palestinians was repeated in Tel Rumeida.

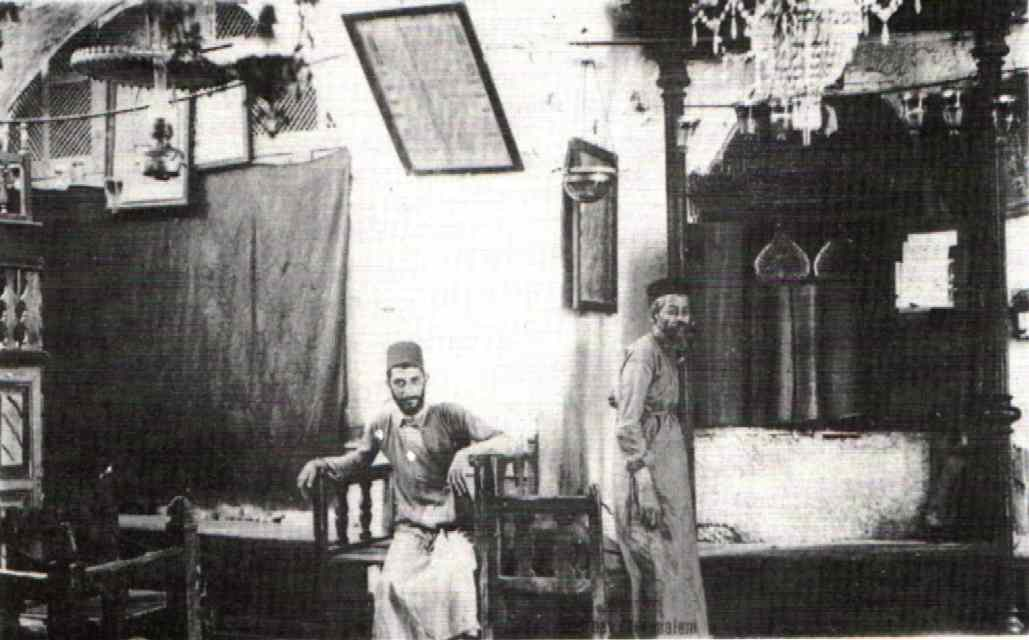
Abraham Avinu Synagogue in 1925

The Abraham Avinu Synagogue was the physical and spiritual center of its neighborhood and regarded as one of the most beautiful synagogues in Palestine. It was the center of Jewish worship in Hebron until it was burnt down during the 1929 riots. In 1948 under Jordanian rule, the remaining ruins were razed. The Avraham Avinu quarter was established next to the Vegetable and Wholesale Markets on Al-Shuhada Street in the south of the Old City. The vegetable market was closed by the Israeli military and some of the neighboring houses were occupied by settlers and soldiers. Settlers started to take over the closed Palestinian stores, despite explicit orders of the Israeli Supreme Court that the settlers should vacate these stores and the Palestinians should be allowed to return. Beit Romano was built and owned by Yisrael Avraham Romano of Constantinople and served Sephardi Jews from Turkey. In 1901, a yeshiva was established there with a dozen teachers and up to 60 students. In 1982, Israeli authorities took over a Palestinian education office (Osama Ben Munqez School) and the adjacent bus station. The school was turned into a settlement, and the bus station into a military base against an order of the Israeli Supreme Court. In 1807 the immigrant Sephardic Rabbi Haim Yeshua Hamitzri (Haim the Jewish Egyptian) purchased 5 dunams on the outskirts of the city and in 1811 he signed a contract for a 99-year lease on a further 800 dunams of land, which included 4 plots in Tel Rumeida. The plots were administered by his descendant Haim Bajaio after Jews left Hebron. Settlers' claims to this land are based on these precedents, but are dismissed by the rabbi's heir. In 1984, settlers established a caravan outpost there called Ramat Yeshai. In 1998, the government recognized it as a settlement, and in 2001 the Defence Minister approved the building of the first housing units.

In 2012, Israel Defense Forces called for the immediate removal of a new settlement, because it was seen as a provocation. The IDF, in accordance with settler demands, requested the removal of a Palestinian flag on a Hebronite rooftop contiguous to settlements, though no rule forbids the practice. According to Palestinians, the IDF negotiated the removal of the flag in exchange for the release of a resident of Hebron from legal custody. In August 2016, Israel announced its intention to allow settlement building in the military compound of Plugat Hamitkanim in Hebron, which had been expropriated for military purposes in the 1990s. In late 2019, the Israeli Defense Minister Naftali Bennett instructed the military administration to inform the Palestinian municipality of the government's intention to reconstruct infrastructure in the old Hebron fruit and vegetable market in order to establish a Jewish neighborhood there, which would allow for doubling the city's settler population. The area's original residents, who have protected tenancy rights there, were compelled to evacuate the zone after the Cave of the Patriarchs massacre. The original site was under Jewish ownership prior to 1948. The plan proposes that the empty shops remain Palestinian while the units built over them house Jewish Israelis.

== Culture ==
=== Cuisine ===
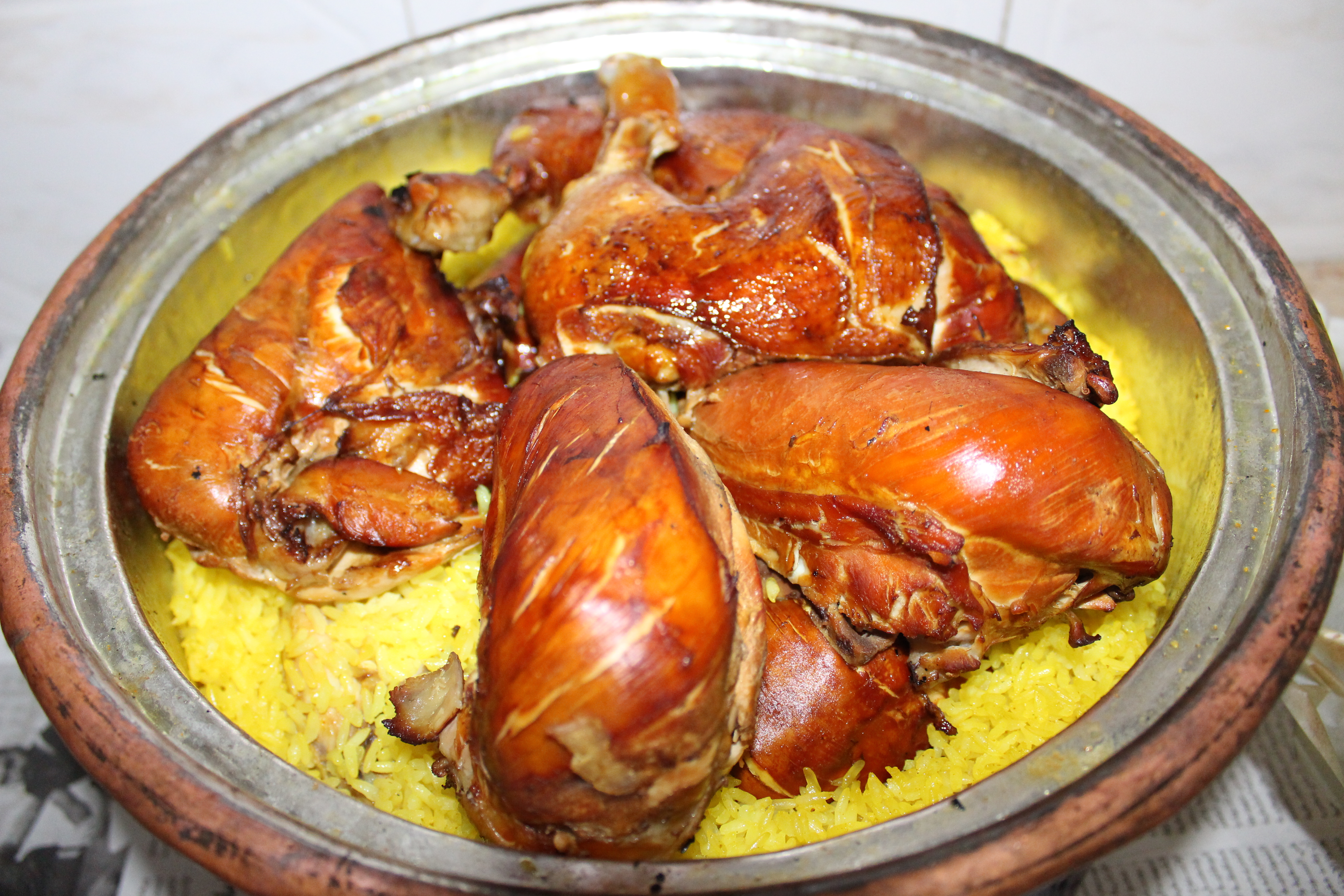
Qidra or qidreh is a famous dish from the city of Hebron

The Hebron Grape Festival is a celebration held annually in Hebron since 2003 where grape farmers display their produce, with the stated goal of boosting economic activity. Besides fresh grapes, many grape preserves are also produced in Hebron, like dried grapes, grape vinegar, grape syrup, grape fruit leather (malban), grape murabba (aintabikh), pickled unripe grapes, and preserved grape leaves for use in stuffed leaves; a common dish in Hebron. Families in Hebron prepare a simple traditional ice-cream by mixing grape syrup into snow, a tradition considered unique to Hebron as it boasts the highest elevation and most snow in the West Bank. Qidreh is a traditional dish originating from Hebron, made from rice, meat, and local clarified butter.

=== Tourism ===
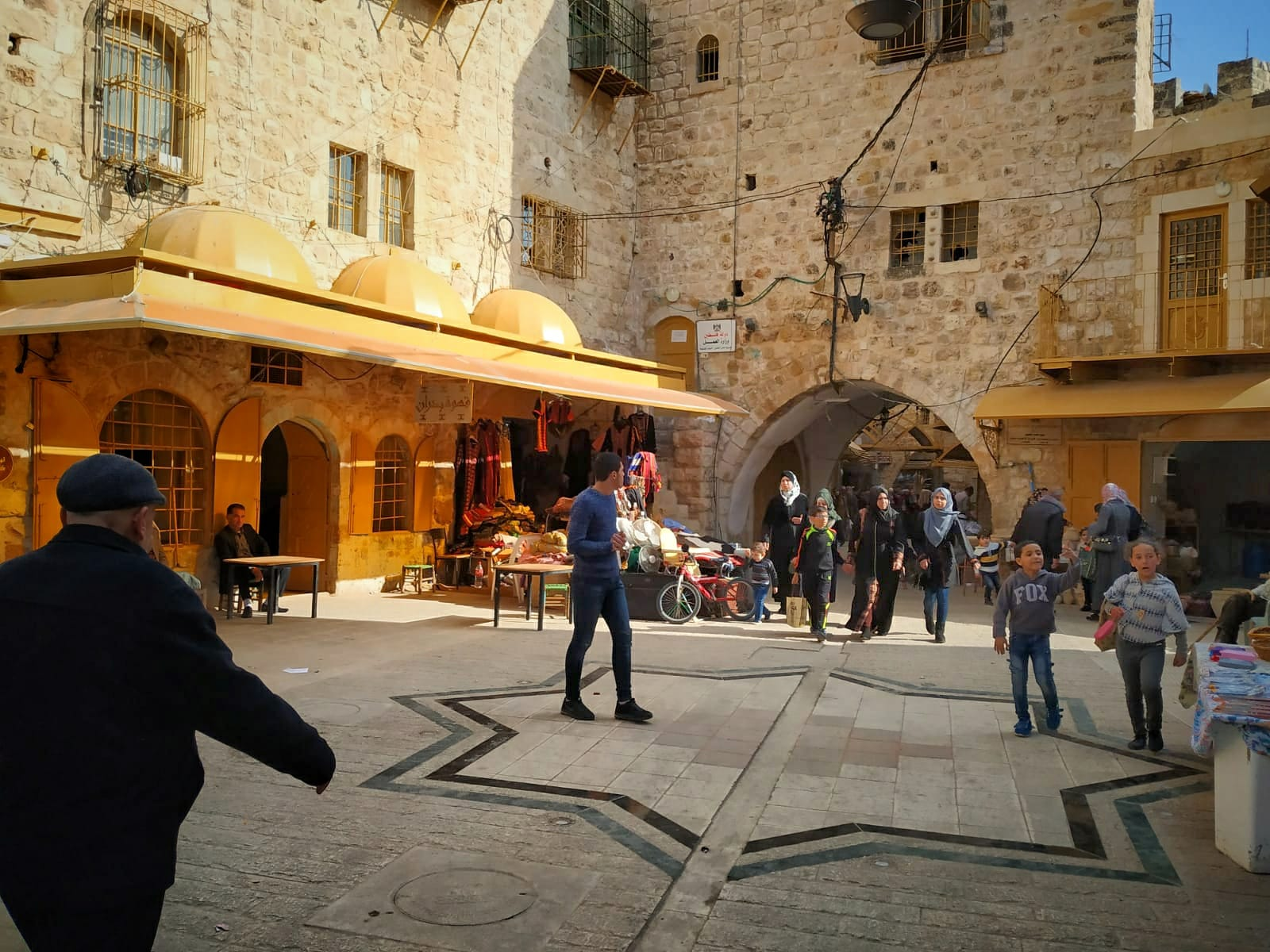
Souk in Old City of Hebron

Hebron is home to numerous mosques, synagogues, churches, parks, palaces, castles and forts. The Old City of Hebron was a declared a Palestinian World Heritage Site by UNESCO on 7 July 2017. The move caused controversies and faced opposition from Israeli officials who objected to it being called as Palestinian site, instead of Israeli. It is one of the best preserved sites of the Mamluk era.

- The most famous site in Hebron is the Cave of the Patriarchs. The Herodian era structure is said to enclose the tombs of the biblical Patriarchs and Matriarchs. The site is known for the burial place of Abraham, Isaac and Jacob, along with their wives Sarah, Rebecca and Leah respectively. The Isaac Hall now serves as the Ibrahimi mosque, while the Abraham and Jacob Hall serve as a synagogue.
- The tombs of other biblical figures – Abner ben Ner, Otniel ben Kenaz, Ruth and Jesse are also located in the city. It is reverred to Christians, Muslims and Jews. These sites are located in the H2 region, which is controlled by the Israeli authorities.
- The early Ottoman-era Abraham Avinu Synagogue in the city's historic Jewish Quarter was built in 1540 and restored in 1738.
- Mosques from the era include the Sheikh Ali al-Bakka and Al-Jawali mosque.

Hebron is also home to several sites for Christian worship, with numerous churches located around the city. The Oak of Sibta (Oak of Abraham) is an ancient tree which, in non-Jewish tradition, is said to mark the place where Abraham pitched his tent. The Russian Orthodox Church owns the site and the nearby Abraham's Oak Holy Trinity Monastery, consecrated in 1925. Hebron is one of the few cities to have preserved its Mamluk architecture. Many structures were built during the period, especially Sufi zawiyas.

Other sites:

- Situated on the northeast of the city, Wadi al–Quff Natural Reserve is visited by 2,000 people, mostly on weekends. It is currently under the management of the Palestinian government.
- Aristobolia (Khirbet Istanbul), in south of Hebron, near Zif village, is home to Byzantine-era basilica, built during the beginning of Islamic era.
- Khirbet al–Karmil is home to Crusader pool, ruined Byzantine church and Crusader fortress.
- As-Samu is an ancient biblical village, currently a modern town. It is home to 4th century synagogue, numerous Ottoman-era structure and an Islamic building, probably built during the time of Saladin of the Ayyubid dynasty.

=== Religious traditions ===
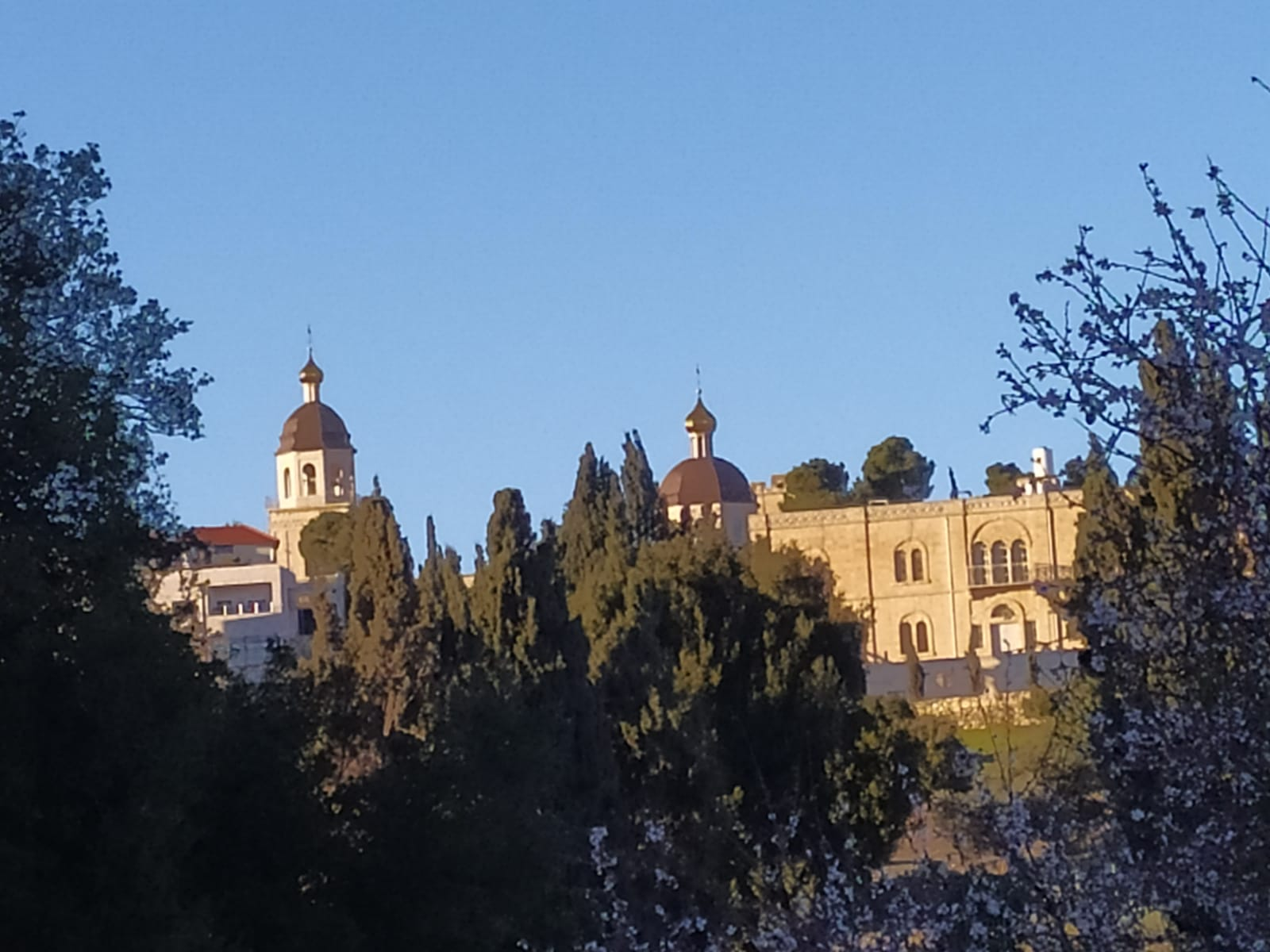
Russian Orthodox Monastery in Hebron

Some Jewish traditions regarding Adam place him in Hebron after his expulsion from Eden. Another has Cain kill Abel there. A third has Adam and Eve buried in the cave of Machpelah. A Jewish-Christian tradition had it that Adam was formed from the red clay of the field of Damascus, near Hebron. A tradition arose in medieval Jewish texts that the Cave of the Patriarchs itself was the very entrance to the Garden of Eden. During the Middle Ages, pilgrims and the inhabitants of Hebron would eat the red earth as a charm against misfortune. Others report that the soil was harvested for export as a precious medicinal spice in Egypt, Arabia, Ethiopia and India and that the earth refilled after every digging. Legend also tells that Noah planted his vineyard on Mount Hebron. In medieval Christian tradition, Hebron was one of the three cities where Elizabeth was said to live, the legend implying that it might have been the birthplace of John the Baptist.

One Islamic tradition has it that Muhammad alighted in Hebron during his night journey from Mecca to Jerusalem, and the mosque in the city is said to conserve one of his shoes. Another tradition states that Muhammad arranged for Hebron and its surrounding villages to become part of Tamim al-Dari's domain; this was implemented during Umar's reign as caliph. According to the arrangement, al-Dari and his descendants were only permitted to tax the residents for their land and the waqf of the Ibrahimi Mosque was entrusted to them. The simat al-Khalil or "Table of Abraham" is attested to in the writings of the 11th century Persian traveler Nasir-i Khusraw. According to the account, this early Islamic food distribution center — which predates the Ottoman imarets — gave all visitors to Hebron a loaf of bread, a bowl of lentils in olive oil, and some raisins.

According to Tamara Neuman, settlement by a community of Jewish religious fundamentalists has brought about three major changes by redesigning a Palestinian area in terms of biblical imagery and origins: remaking over these revamped religious sites to endow them with an innovative centrality to Jewish worship, that, she argues, effectively erases the diasporic thrust of Jewish tradition; and writing out the overlapping aspects of Judaism, Christianity and Islam in such a way that the possibility of accommodation between the three intertwined traditions is eradicated, while the presence of Palestinians themselves is erased by violent methods.

== Gallery ==
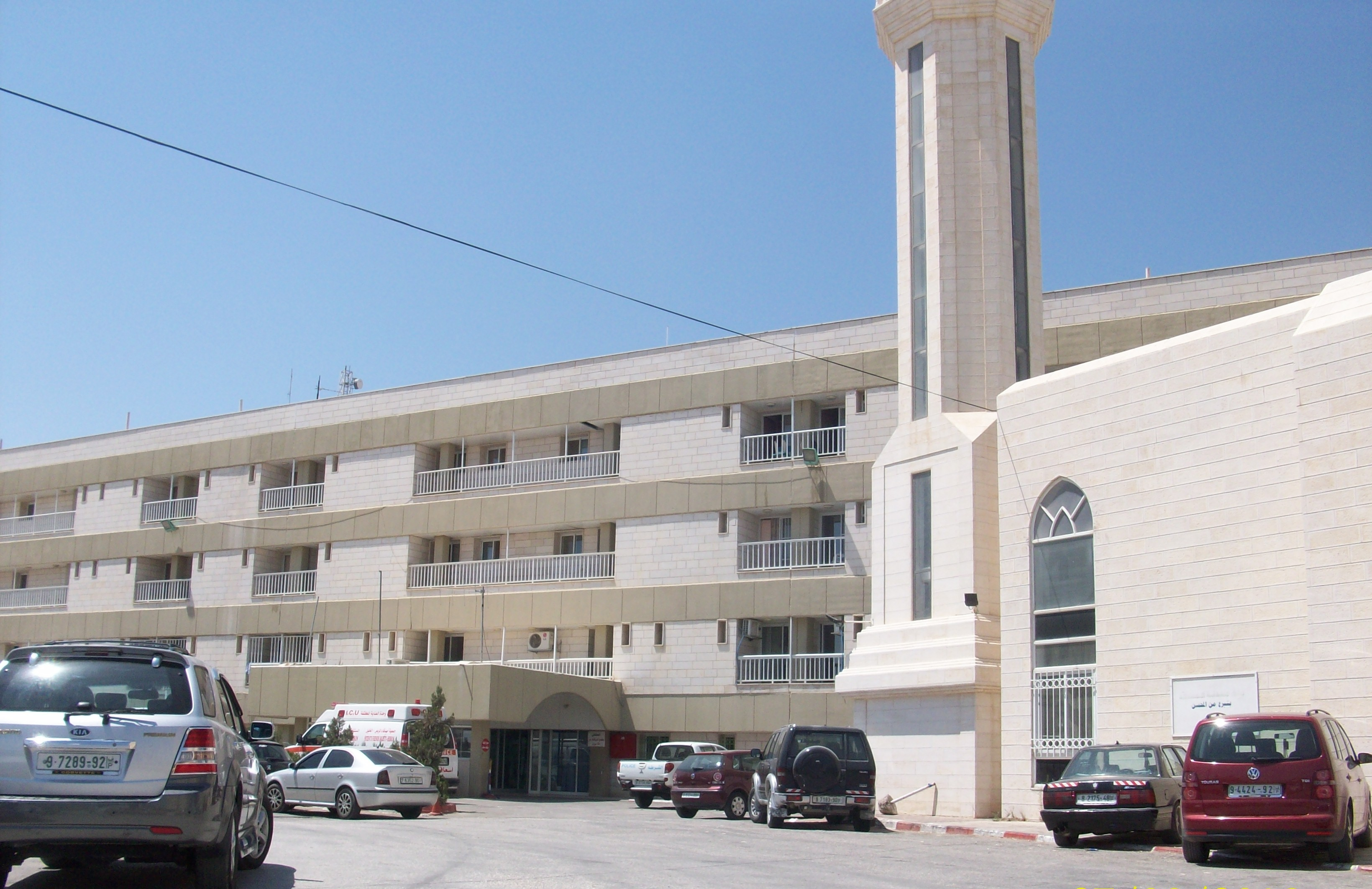
Al-Ahli Arab Hospital, Hebron

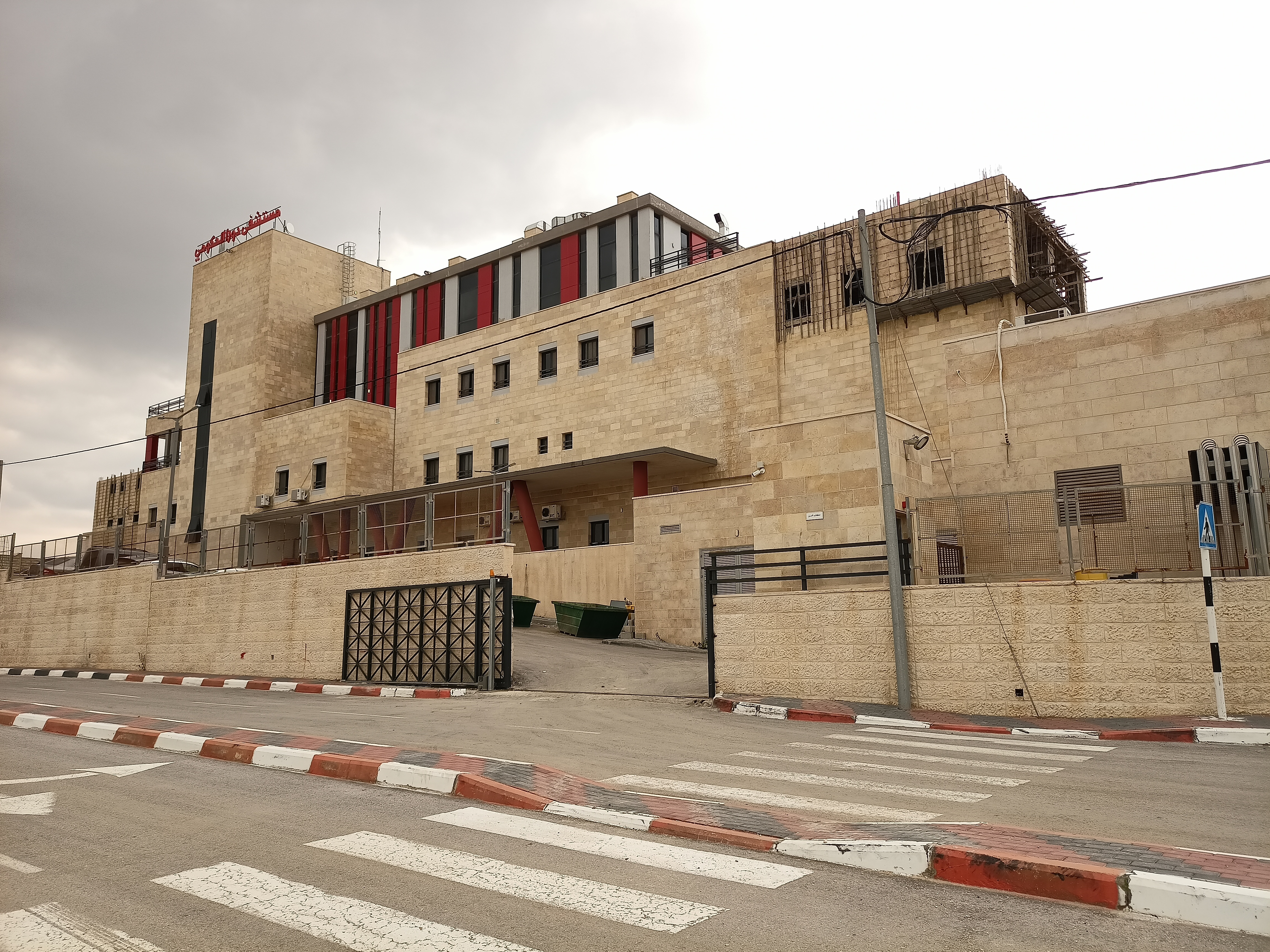
Dura Hospital

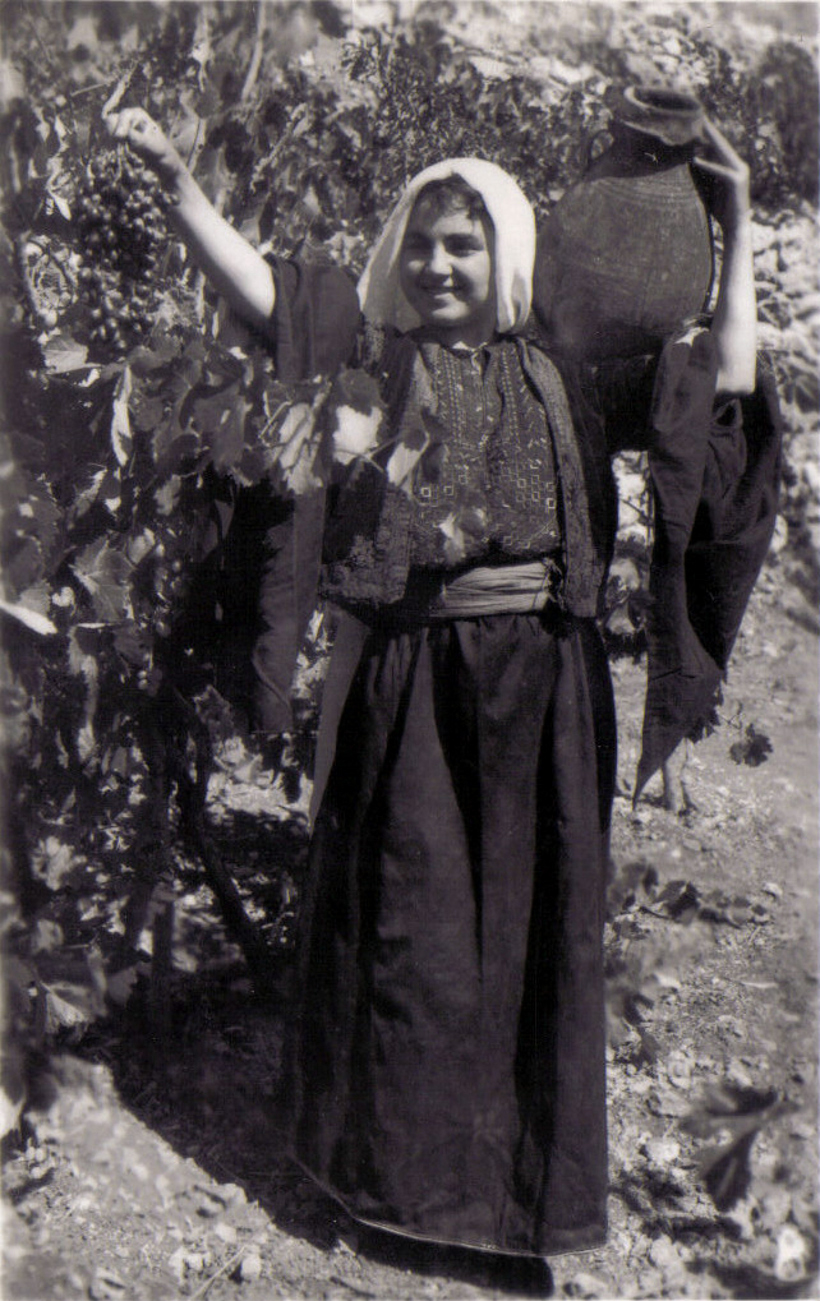
A Palestinian woman from Hebron wearing Palestinian traditional dress in 1947

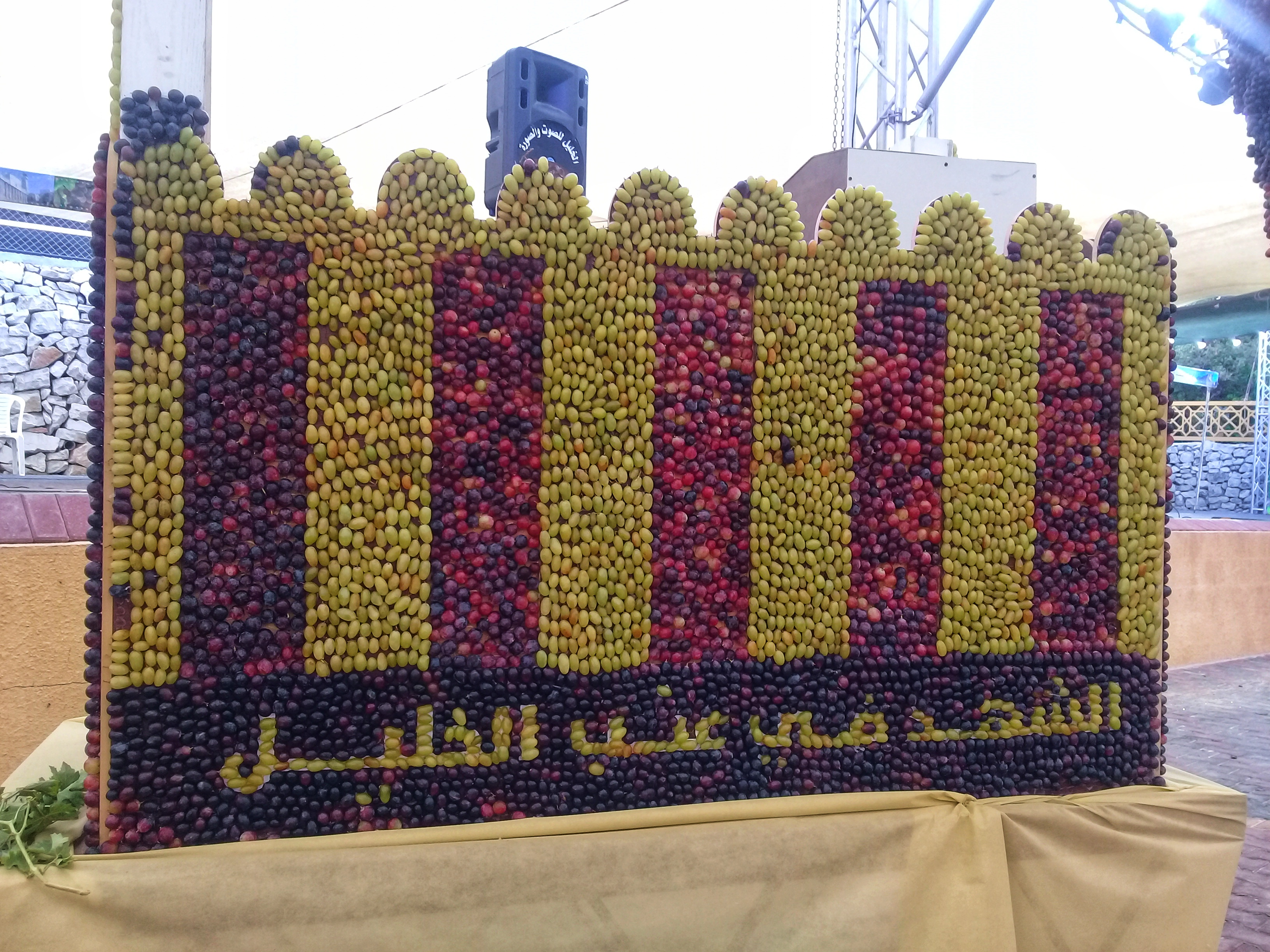
Hebron Grape Festival in 2019

== Twin towns / sister cities ==
Hebron is twinned with:

- Amman (Jordan)
- Beyoğlu (Turkey)
- Bursa (Turkey)
- Casablanca, Morocco
- Derby, England
- Fez (Morocco)
- Jajmau (India)
- Keçiören (Turkey)
- Kraljevo, Serbia
- Medina (Saudi Arabia)
- Saint-Pierre-des-Corps (France)
- Şanlıurfa (Turkey)
- Yiwu (China)

== See also ==
- Abraham's Oak Holy Trinity Monastery, Russian Orthodox monastery at the "Oak of Mamre"
- List of burial places of biblical figures
- List of people from Hebron
- Oak of Mamre, Christian holy site, historically near Hebron but now inside the city, distinct from the Terebinth of Mamre
- Palestinian Child Arts Center
- Shabab Al-Khalil SC, the town's football team

== Sources ==
- Albright, W.F. (2000) [1975]. "The Amarna letters from Palestine". In Eiddon, Iorwerth; Edwards, Stephen; Gadd, C. J. (eds.). Cambridge Ancient History: The Middle East and Aegean Region c. 1380–1000 BC. Vol. 2 (3 ed.). Cambridge University Press. pp. 98–116. ISBN 978-0-521-08691-2.
- Al-Muqaddasi (2001). Collins, B. A. (ed.). The Best Divisions for Knowledge of the Regions. Ahasan al-Taqasim Fi Ma'rifat al-Aqalim. Reading: Garnet Publishing. ISBN 978-1-85964-136-1.
- Adler, E. (1994) [1930]. Jewish Travellers. Asian Educational Services. ISBN 978-8-120-60952-5.
- Alter, R. (1996). Genesis: Translation and Commentary. W. W. Norton. pp. 886–888. ISBN 978-0-393-03981-8.
- Aksan, V.H.; Goffman, Daniel (2007). The early modern Ottomans: remapping the Empire. Cambridge University Press. ISBN 978-0-521-81764-6.
- Alimi, Eitan (2013). Israeli Politics and the First Palestinian Intifada: Political Opportunities, Framing Processes and Contentious Politics. Routledge. ISBN 978-1-134-17182-8.
- Auerbach, J. (2009). Hebron Jews: Memory and Conflict in the Land of Israel. Rowman & Littlefield. ISBN 978-0-742-56617-0.
- Barnay, Jacob (1992). Goldblum, Naomi (ed.). The Jews in Palestine in the Eighteenth Century: Under the Patronage of the Istanbul Committee of Officials for Palestine. University of Alabama Press. ISBN 978-0-817-30572-7.
- Barron, J. B., ed. (1923). Palestine: Report and General Abstracts of the Census of 1922. Government of Palestine.
- Bauman, Mark K. (1994). Harry H. Epstein and the Rabbinate as Conduit for Change. New York & London: Fairleigh Dickinson University Press. ISBN 978-0-8386-3541-4.
- Beilin, Y. (2004). The Path to Geneva: The Quest for a Permanent Agreement, 1996–2004. Akashic Books. ISBN 978-0-9719206-3-7.
- Benjamin (of Tudela) (1907). Adler, Marcus Nathan (ed.). The Itinerary of Benjamin of Tudela: Critical Text, Translation and Commentary. Oxford: Henry Frowde. Reprint: ISBN 978-0-8370-2263-5.
- Berger, Pamela (2012). The Crescent on the Temple: The Dome of the Rock as Image of the Ancient Jewish Sanctuary. Brill's Studies in Religion and the Arts. Vol. 5. Brill. ISBN 978-9-004-20300-6.
- Boas, Adrian J. (1999). Crusader archaeology: the material culture of the Latin East. Routledge. ISBN 978-0-415-17361-2.
- Bonar, H. (1858). The Land of Promise: Notes of a Spring-journey from Beersheba to Sidon. James Nisbet & Co.
- Bouckaert, P. (2001). Bencomo, Clarissa (ed.). Center of the Storm: A Case Study of Human Rights Abuses in Hebron District. Human Rights Watch. ISBN 978-1-56432-260-9.
- Bovard, J. (2004) [2003]. Terrorism and Tyranny: Trampling Freedom, Justice, and Peace to Rid the World of Evil. Palgrave Macmillan. ISBN 978-1-403-96682-7.
- Bratcher, Robert G; Newman, Barclay Moon (1983). A Translator's Handbook on the Book of Joshua. United Bible Societies. ISBN 978-0-8267-0105-3.
- Brill, E. J. (1993). E. J. Brill's First Encyclopaedia of Islam, 1913–1936, Volume 4. Brill. ISBN 978-90-04-09796-4.
- "Hebron, Area H-2: Settlements Cause Mass Departure of Palestinians" (PDF). B'Tselem. August 2003.
- Büssow, J. (2011). Hamidian Palestine: Politics and Society in the District of Jerusalem 1872–1908. Brill. ISBN 978-90-04-20569-7.
- Campbell, Deborah (2004). This Heated Place: Encounters in the Promised Land. Douglas & McIntyre. ISBN 978-1-55054-967-6.
- Campos, Michelle (2007). "Remembering Jewish-Arab Contact and Conflict". In Sufian, Sandra Marlene; LeVine, M. (eds.). Reapproaching borders: new perspectives on the study of Israel-Palestine. Rowman & Littlefield. pp. 41–66. ISBN 978-0-7425-4639-4.
- Carter, Charles E. (1999). The Emergence of Yehud in the Persian Period: A Social and Demographic Study. Journal for the study of the Old Testament: Supplement series. Vol. 294. New York & London: Continuum International Publishing Group. ISBN 978-1-84127-012-8.
- Cazelles, H. (1981). "Chābhar". In Botterweck, G.J.; Ringgren, H.; Fabry, H.-J. (eds.). Theological dictionary of the Old Testament. Vol. 4. Wm. B. Eerdmans Publishing. pp. 193–197. ISBN 978-0-8028-2328-1.
- Churchill, R. (1967). The Six Day War. Ritana Books. ISBN 978-81-85250-14-4.
- Cohen, Esther Rosalind (1985). Human rights in the Israeli-occupied territories, 1967–1982. Manchester University Press. ISBN 978-0-7190-1726-1.
- Cohen, H. (2009) [2008]. Watzman, Haim (ed.). Army of Shadows: Palestinian Collaboration with Zionism, 1917–1948. University of California Press. ISBN 978-1-55054-967-6.
- Cohen, H. (2015). Year Zero of the Arab-Israeli Conflict: 1929. Brandeis University Press. ISBN 978-1-611-68811-5.
- Conder, C.R. (1879). Tent Work in Palestine. A Record of Discovery and Adventure. Vol. 2. Richard Bentley & Son (published for the Committee of the PEF). OCLC 23589738.
- Conder, J. (1830). The Modern Traveller: A Description, Geographical, Historical, and Topographical, of the Various Countries of the Globe. Vol. 1. J. Duncan.
- Cordesman, A.H. (2006). Arab-Israeli Military Forces in an Era of Asymmetric War. Greenwood Publishing Group. ISBN 978-0-275-99186-9.
- Craveri, M. (1967). The Life of Jesus: An assessment through modern historical evidence. Pan Books.
- David, Abraham (2010). To Come to the Land: Immigration and Settlement in 16th-Century Eretz-Israel. University of Alabama Press. ISBN 978-0-817-35643-9.
- De Cesari, Chiara (2009). Cultural Heritage Beyond the "state": Palestinian Heritage Between Nationalism and Transnationalism. Stanford University Dept. of Anthropology. ISBN 978-0-549-98604-1.
- Duke, Robert R. (2010). The Social Location of the Visions of Amram (4Q543-547). Studies in biblical literature. Vol. 135. Peter Lang. ISBN 978-1-4331-0789-4.
- Dumper, Michael (2003). "Hebron". In Dumper, Michael; Stanley, Bruce E. (eds.). Cities of the Middle East and North Africa: a historical encyclopedia. ABC-CLIO. pp. 164–67. ISBN 978-1-57607-919-5.
- Efrat, Elisha (1984). Urbanization in Israel. Taylor & Francis. ISBN 978-0-7099-0931-6.
- Eisenberg, Emanuel; Bar Nathan, Rachel (2024). "תל חברון בתקופה ההלניסטית-חשמונאית: "מאדומים ליהודים" / Hellenistic–Hasmonaean Tel Hebron: from Idumeans to Jews". Eretz-Israel: Archaeological, Historical and Geographical Studies (in Hebrew). 35. Israel Exploration Society: 361–372. JSTOR 27390018.
- Elazar, Daniel E. (1998). Covenant and Polity in Biblical Israel: Biblical Foundations & Jewish Expressions. Transaction Publishers. ISBN 978-0-7658-0452-5.
- Emmett, Chad F. (2000). "Sharing Sacred Space in the Holy Land". In Murphy, Alexander B.; Johnson, Douglas L.; Haarmann, Viola (eds.). Cultural encounters with the environment: enduring and evolving geographic themes. Rowman & Littlefield. pp. 261–82. ISBN 978-0-7425-0106-5.
- Falah, Ghazi (1985). "Recent Colonization in Hebron". In Newman, David (ed.). The Impact of Gush Emunim: politics and settlement in the West Bank. London: Croom Helm. pp. 245–61. ISBN 978-0-7099-1821-9.
- Feige, Michael (2009). Settling in the hearts: Jewish fundamentalism in the occupied territories. Wayne State University Press. ISBN 978-0-8143-2750-0.
- Finkelstein, I.; Silberman, N.A. (2001). Covenant The Bible Unearthed: Archaeology's New Vision of Ancient Israel and the Origin of Sacred Texts. Simon and Schuster. ISBN 978-0-7432-2338-6.
- Finn, J. (1868). Byeways in Palestine. London: James Nisbett.
- Finn, J. (1878). Stirring Times, or Records from Jerusalem Consular Chronicles of 1853–1856. Vol. 2. Location: C.K. Paul & Co.
- First Census of Population and Housing. Volume I: Final Tables; General Characteristics of the Population (PDF). Government of Jordan, Department of Statistics. 1964.
- Flusfeder, Helena (24 January 1997). "Hebron welcomes pull-out". Times Higher Education.
- Josephus, Flavius (1860) [1737]. Whiston, William (ed.). The complete works of Flavius Josephus. London: T. Nelson and sons, 1860.
- Forbes, R.J. (1965) [1955]. Studies in Ancient Technology. Vol. 2 (2 ed.). Brill.
- Freedland, J. (23 February 2012). "An Exclusive Corner of Hebron". New York Review of Books. pp. 21–23.
- Frenkel, Yehoshua (2011). Hebron — An Islamic Sacred City (634–1099) (in JSTOR) (חברון — עיר קודש אסלאמית 634–1099 לסה"נ) (Catedra: For the History of Eretz Israel and Its Yishuv, issue 141, p. 27 – 52) (in Hebrew)
- Gil, Moshe (1997) [1983]. A History of Palestine, 634–1099. Translated by Ethel Broido. Cambridge: Cambridge University Press. ISBN 0-521-59984-9.
- Gelvin, James L. (2007). The Israel–Palestine Conflict: One Hundred Years of War. University of California Press. ISBN 978-0-521-88835-6.
- Glick, Leonard B. (1994). "Religion and Genocide". In Charny, I. W. (ed.). The Widening Circle of Genocide. Genocide: A Critical Bibliography. Vol. 3. TRansaction Publishers/Institute on the Holocaust and Genocide. pp. 43–74. ISBN 978-1-412-83965-5.
- Goldberg, J. (May 2004). "Among The Settlers". The New Yorker.
- Gorenberg, G. (2007). The Accidental Empire: Israel and the Birth of the Settlements, 1967–1977. Times Books, Henry Holt and Co. ISBN 978-0-8050-8241-8.
- Gottwald, N.K. (1999). The tribes of Yahweh: a sociology of the religion of liberated Israel, 1250–1050 BCE. Continuum International Publishing. ISBN 978-1-84127-026-5.
- Graetz, H. (1895). Löwy, Bella (ed.). The History of the Jews:From the Chmielnicki Persecution of the Jews in Poland (1648 CE) to the Period of Emancipation in Central Europe (c. 1870 CE). Vol. 5. Jewish Publication Society of America.
- Green, T. (2007). Inquisition; The Reign of Fear. Macmillan Press. ISBN 978-1-4050-8873-2.
- Harel, A. (17 November 2002). "The attack in Hebron was not a 'massacre'". Haaretz. Archived from the original on 26 February 2014.
- Hasasneh, Nabeel (15 March 2005). "Hebron University". Digi-arts. Unesco Knowledge Portal.
- Hasson, Nir (29 September 2016). "Ancient Toilet Reveals the Unique Way the Israelites Fought Idol-worship". Haaretz. Archived from the original on 28 September 2016.
- Hezser, Catherine (2002). "The Social Status of Slaves in the Talmud Yerushalmi and in Graeco-Roman Society". In Schäfer, Peter (ed.). The Talmud Yerushalmi and Graece-Roman Culture. Texte und Studien zum antiken Judentum. Vol. 3. Mohr Siebeck. pp. 91–138. ISBN 978-0-567-02242-4.
- Hiro, D. (1999). Sharing the Promised Land: a tale of Israelis and Palestinians Olive. Olive Branch Press. ISBN 978-1-566-56319-2.
- Honigmann, Ernst (1993) [1927]. "Hebron". In Houtsma, M.T. (ed.). E.J. Brill's first encyclopedia of Islam, 1913–1936. Vol. IV. Brill. pp. 886–888. ISBN 978-90-04-09790-2.
- Halpern, Ben; Reinharz, J. (2000). Zionism and the Creation of a New Society. University Press of New England. ISBN 978-1-58465-023-2.
- Hamilton, V.P. (1995). The book of Genesis: chapters 18–50. The New international commentary on the Old Testament. Vol. 2. Wm. B. Eerdmans Publishing. ISBN 978-0-8028-2309-0.
- Hyamson, A.M. (1917). Palestine, the Rebirth of an Ancient People. New York: A. A. Knopf.
- Japhet, S. (1993). I & II Chronicles: A Commentary. Westminster John Knox Press. ISBN 978-0-664-22641-1.
- Jericke, Detlef (2003). Abraham in Mamre: Historische und exegetische Studien zur Region von Hebron und zu Genesis 11, 27 – 19, 38. Brill. ISBN 978-90-04-12939-9.
- Kamrava, Mehran (2010). The Modern Middle East: A Political History since the First World War (2 ed.). University of California Press. ISBN 978-0-520-94753-5.
- Katz, Yaakov; Lazaroff, Tovah (14 April 2007). "Hebron settlers try to buy more homes". The Jerusalem Post. Archived from the original on 11 January 2012.
- Kedar, B.Z. (2000). The Changing Land: Between the Jordan and the Sea: Aerial Photographs from 1917 to the present. Wayne State University Press. ISBN 978-0-8143-2915-3.
- Kellerman, Aharon (1993). Society and settlement: Jewish land of Israel in the twentieth century. Albany, New York: SUNY Press. ISBN 978-0-7914-1295-4.
- Khalidi, R. (1998) [1998]. Palestinian Identity: The Construction of Modern National Consciousness. Columbia University Press. ISBN 978-0-231-10515-6.
- Kimmerling, B.; Migdal, Joel S. (2003). The Palestinian people: a history. Harvard University Press. ISBN 978-0-674-01129-8.
- Kohler, C. (1896). "Un nouveau récit de l'invention des Patriarches Abraham, Isaac et Jacob à Hebron". Revue de l'Orient Latin. 4. Paris: 477.
- Kosover, Mordecai (1966). Arabic elements in Palestinian Yiddish: the old Ashkenazic Jewish community in Palestine, its history and its language. R. Mass.
- Kraeling, E.G.H. (April 1925). "The Early Cult of Hebron and Judg. 16:1–3". The American Journal of Semitic Languages and Literatures. 41 (3): 174–178. doi:10.1086/370066. S2CID 171070877.
- Krämer, G. (2011). A History of Palestine: From the Ottoman Conquest to the Founding of the State of Israel. Princeton University Press. ISBN 978-0-691-15007-9.
- Kraemer, Joel L (2001). "The Life of Moses Ben Maimon". In Fine, Lawrence (ed.). Judaism in Practice: From the Middle Ages Through the Early Modern Period. Princeton University Press. pp. 413–428. ISBN 978-0-691-05787-3.
- Kretzmer, D. (2002). The Occupation of Justice: The Supreme Court of Israel and the Occupied Territories. Albany, New York: SUNY Press. ISBN 978-0-7914-5338-4.
- Kupferschmidt, Uri M. (1987). The Supreme Muslim Council: Islam Under the British Mandate for Palestine. Brill. ISBN 978-9-004-07929-8.
- Lamdan, Ruth (2000). A Separate People: Jewish Women in Palestine, Syria, and Egypt in the Sixteenth Century. Brill's Series in Jewish Studies. Vol. 26. Brill. ISBN 978-9-004-11747-1.
- Laurens, H. (1999). La question de Palestine: 1799–1922, l'invention de la terre sainte. Vol. 1. Paris: Fayard. ISBN 978-2-213-60349-0.
- Lemaire, A. (2006). "New Aramaic Ostraca from Idumea and their Historical Interpretation". In Lipschitz, Oded; Oeming, Manfred (eds.). Judah and the Judeans in the Persian Period. Eisenbrauns. pp. 413–456. ISBN 978-1-57506-104-7.
- Le Strange, G. (1890). Palestine Under the Moslems: A Description of Syria and the Holy Land from AD 650 to 1500. London: Alexander P. Watt. Reprint: ISBN 978-1-143-27239-4.
- Levi della Vida, G. (1993) [1927]. "Tamīm al-Dārī". In Houtsma, M.T.; Arnold, T.W. (eds.). E.J. Brill's first encyclopedia of Islam, 1913–1936. Vol. VIII. Brill. pp. 646–648. ISBN 978-90-04-09796-4.
- Levin, J. (2005). West Bank Diary: Middle East Violence as Reported by a Former American Hostage. Hope Publishing House. ISBN 978-1-932717-03-7.
- Levy, G. (31 July 2012). "Border Police, Hebron's substitute for summer camp counselors". Haaretz.
- Lied, Liv Ingeborg (2008). The Other Lands of Israel: Imaginations of the Land in 2 Baruch. Brill. ISBN 978-9-004-16556-4.
- Loewenstein, A. (2007). My Israel Question. Melbourne University Press. ISBN 978-0-522-85418-3.
- Lustick, I. (1988). For the Land and the Lord: Jewish fundamentalism in Israel. New York: Council on Foreign Relations. p. 205. ISBN 978-0-87609-036-7.
- Magen, Yitzakh (2007). "The Dating of the First Phase of the Samaritan Temple on Mt Gerizim in Light of Archaeological Evidence". In Lipschitz, Oded; Knoppers, Gary N.; Albertz, Rainer (eds.). Judah and the Judeans in the Fourth Century BCE. Eisenbrauns. pp. 157–212. ISBN 978-1-575-06130-6.
- Marcus, J.R. (1996). The Jew in the American world: a source book. Wayne State University Press. p. 85. ISBN 978-0-814-32548-3.
- Mattar, P. (2005). Encyclopedia of the Palestinians. Infobase Publishing. ISBN 978-0-8160-6986-6.
- Medina, Jennifer (22 April 2007). "Settlers' Defiance Reflects Postwar Israeli Changes". The New York Times.
- Meri, J.W. (2004). Medieval Islamic Civilization. Routledge. ISBN 978-0-415-96690-0.
- Micheau, Françoise (2006). "Eastern Christianities (eleventh to fourteenth century): Copts, Melkites, Nestorians and Jacobites". In Angold, M. (ed.). Eastern Christianity. The Cambridge History of Christianity. Vol. 5. Cambridge University Press. pp. 373–403. ISBN 978-0-521-81113-2.
- Milman, H.H. (1840). The history of Christianity: from the birth of Christ to the abolition of paganism in the Roman Empire. London: John Murray.
- Moudjir ed-dyn (1876). Sauvaire (ed.). Histoire de Jérusalem et d'Hébron depuis Abraham jusqu'à la fin du XVe siècle de J.-C. : fragments de la Chronique de Moudjir-ed-dyn. Paris: Leroux.
- Mulder, M.J. (2004). "Qirya". In Botterweck, G. Johannes; Ringgren, Helmer; Fabry, Heinz-Josef (eds.). Theological dictionary of the Old Testament. Vol. 13. Wm. B. Eerdmans Publishing. pp. 164–167. ISBN 978-0-8028-2337-3.
- Murphy-O'Connor, J. (1998). The Holy Land: An Oxford Archaeological Guide from Earliest Times to 1700. Oxford University Press. ISBN 978-0-19-288013-0.
- Na'aman, Nadav (2005). Canaan in the 2nd Millennium BCE. Eisenbrauns. ISBN 978-1-575-06113-9.
- Murray, Alan V. (2000). The Crusader Kingdom of Jerusalem. Prosopographica et Genealogica. ISBN 978-1-9009-3403-9.
- Negev, A.; Gibson, S., eds. (2001). Archaeological Encyclopedia of the Holy Land. Continuum International Publishing Group. ISBN 978-0-14-311489-5.
- Neuman, Tamara (2018). Settling Hebron : Jewish Fundamentalism in a Palestinian City. University of Pennsylvania Press. ISBN 978-0-812-24995-8.
- Niesiolowski-Spano, Lukasz (2016). The Origin Myths and Holy Places in the Old Testament: A Study of Aetiological Narratives. Translated by Jacek Laskowski. Routledge. ISBN 978-1-134-93830-8.
- Norwich, J.J. (1999). Byzantium; The Early Centuries. Knopf. ISBN 978-0-394-53778-8.
- Pedahzur, Ami; Perliger, Arie (2011). Jewish Terrorism in Israel. Columbia University Press. ISBN 978-0-231-15447-5.
- PHRIC (25 February 1994). "Details of Hebron Massacre: List of victims of the incident and subsequent disturbances". Palestine Human Rights Information Center. Archived from the original on 16 July 2012.
- Perera, V. (1996) [1995]. The Cross and the Pear Tree: A Sephardic Journey. University of California Press. ISBN 978-0-520-20652-6.
- Platt, E. (2012). City of Abraham: History, Myth and Memory: A Journey through Hebron. Pan Macmillan. ISBN 978-1-447-21330-7.
- Renan, E. (1864). The life of Jesus. Trübner.
- Ricca, Simone (2007). Reinventing Jerusalem: Israel's Reconstruction of the Jewish Quarter after 1967. I.B.Tauris. ISBN 978-1-84511-387-2.
- Richard, Jean (1999). The Crusades, c. 1071–c. 1291. Cambridge University Press. ISBN 978-0-521-62566-1.
- Robins, Philip (2004). A History of Jordan. Cambridge University Press. ISBN 978-0-521-59895-8.
- Robinson, E.; Smith, E. (1856). Biblical researches in Palestine, 1838–52. A journal of travels in the year 1838. Vol. 2. Boston: Crocker and Brewster. Archived from the original on 22 January 2020.
- Rothrock, James (2011). Live by the Sword: Israel's Struggle for Existence in the Holy Land. WestBow Press. ISBN 978-1-449-72519-8.
- Rubenberg, C. (2003). The Palestinians: in search of a just peace. Lynne Rienner Publishers. p. 157. ISBN 978-1-58826-225-7.
- Runciman, S. (1965a) [1951]. A History of the Crusades:The First Crusade and the Foundation of the Kingdom of Jerusalem. Penguin Books. ISBN 978-1-78292-436-4.
- Runciman, S. (1965b) [1952]. A History of the Crusades:The Kingdom of Jerusalem and the Frankish East 1100–1187. Penguin Books. ISBN 978-0-521-34771-6.
- Runciman, S. (1965c) [1954]. A History of the Crusades:The Kingdom of Acre and the Later Crusades. Penguin Books. ISBN 978-0-521-34772-3.
- Salaville, Sévérien (1910). "Hebron". In Herbermann, C.G.; Pace, E.A.; Pallen, C.B.; Shahan, T.J.; Wynne, John Joseph; MacErlean, Andrew Alphonsus (eds.). The Catholic encyclopedia: an international work of reference on the constitution, doctrine, discipline, and history of the Catholic church. Vol. 7. Robert Appleton company. pp. 184–186.
- Scharfstein, Sol (1994). Understanding Israel. Jerusalem: KTAV Publishing House, Inc. ISBN 978-0-88125-428-0.
- Schölch, Alexander (1993). Palestine in Transformation, 1856–1882: studies in social, economic, and political development (PDF). Institute for Palestine Studies. ISBN 978-0-88728-234-8.
- Schürer, E.; Millar, F.; Vermes, G. (1973). The History of the Jewish People in the Age of Jesus Christ (175 BC – AD 135). Vol. 1. Continuum International Publishing Group. ISBN 978-0-567-02242-4.
- Schwarz, Leo Walder (1963). Memoirs of My People: Jewish Self-portraits from the 11th to the 20th Centuries. New York: Schocken Books.
- Schwarz, Yehoseph (1850). Leeser, I. (ed.). A Descriptive Geography and Brief Historical Sketch of Palestine. A. Hart.
- "Settlers' revenge leaves Hebron bleeding". The Scotsman. 30 July 2002. Archived from the original on 21 October 2007.
- Segev, T. (2001). Palestine, Complete; Jews and Arabs under the British Mandate. Little, Brown and company. ISBN 978-4-444-40801-1.
- Segev, T. (2008) [2007]. 1967. Israel, the War and the Year that Transformed the Middle East. Abacus Books. ISBN 978-0-349-11595-5.
- Sharon, M., ed. (1997). Corpus Inscriptionum Arabicarum Palaestinae:A. Handbuch der Orientalistik: Nahe und der Mittlere Osten. Vol. 1. Brill. pp. 117–118. ISBN 978-90-04-10833-2.
- Sharon, M. (2003). "Palestine Under the Mameluks and the Ottoman Empire (1291–1918)". In Avi-Yonah, M. (ed.). A History of Israel and the Holy Land. Continuum International Publishing Group. pp. 272–322. ISBN 978-0-8264-1526-4.
- Sharon, M. (2007). Corpus Inscriptionum Arabicarum Palaestinae addendum: squeezes in the Max van Berchem collection (Palestine, Trans-Jordan, Northern Syria): squeezes 1–84. Handbuch der Orientalistik: Nahe und der Mittlere Osten. Vol. 30. Brill. pp. 104–107. ISBN 978-90-04-15780-4.
- Commission of Inquiry (26 June 1994). "Commission of Inquiry into the massacre at the tomb of the Patriarchs in Hebron". MFA. Archived from the original on 12 January 2013.
- Shaw, T. (1808). Travels or observations relating to several parts of Barbary and the Levant. Vol. 2. Edinburgh: J. Ritchie.
- Sherlock, Ruth (20 November 2010). "Palestinian In bid to revive the old city, Hebron residents put on traditional food festival". Haaretz. Archived from the original on 23 November 2010.
- Shragai, N. (23 September 2008). "A window on the massacre". Haaretz. Archived from the original on 28 October 2008.
- Sicker, Martin (1999). Reshaping Palestine: From Muhammad Ali to the British Mandate, 1831–1922. Greenwood Publishing Group. ISBN 978-0-275-96639-3.
- Singer, A. (2002). Constructing Ottoman Beneficence: An Imperial Soup Kitchen in Jerusalem. New York: SUNY Press. Reprint: ISBN 978-0-7914-5352-0.
- Smith, W.R. (1963) [1903]. Cook, Stanley A. (ed.). Kinship and Marriage in Early Arabia. Boston: Beacon Press. Reprint: ISBN 978-0-8264-1526-4.
- Sternhell, Z. (1999). The Founding Myths of Israel: Nationalism, Socialism, and the Making of the Jewish State. Princeton University Press. ISBN 978-0-691-00967-4.
- Tarākī, L., ed. (2006). Living Palestine: Family Survival, Resistance, And Mobility Under Occupation. Syracuse University Press. ISBN 978-0-815-63107-1.
- Towner, Wayne Sibley (2001). Genesis. Westminster John Knox Press. ISBN 978-0-664-25256-4.
- Turner, W. (1820). Journal of a tour in the Levant. Vol. 2. John Murray.
- Van Luit, Tehilah (2009). Mediene Remnants: Yiddish Sources in the Netherlands Outside of Amsterdam. Brill. ISBN 978-9-004-15625-8.
- Vilnay, Z. (1973) [1932]. Legends of Palestine. Jewish Publication Society of America. ISBN 978-0-827-60004-1.
- Weber, Elizabeth Dolly; Dubovoy, Sina (1995). "Hebron (West Bank)". In Ring, T.; Salkin, R.M.; Boda, S.L. (eds.). International Dictionary of Historic Places: Middle East and Africa. Fitzroy Dearborn. ISBN 978-1-884964-03-9.
- "The Weekly Visitor". Religious Tract Society. November 1833. pp. 433–440.
- Wein, B. (1993). Triumph of survival: the story of the Jews in the modern era, 1650–1990. Mesorah Publications. ISBN 978-0-89906-498-7.
- Wilson, J. (1847). The lands of the Bible visited and described. Vol. 1. White.
- Wilson, C.W. (1881). Triumph of survival: the story of the Jews in the modern era, 1650–1990. D. Appleton.
- Wilson, Mary Christina (1990). King Abdullah, Britain and the Making of Jordan. Cambridge Middle East library. Vol. 13. Cambridge University Press. ISBN 978-0-521-39987-6.
- Wineman, Aryeh (1999). Ethical tales from the kabbalah: stories from the kabbalistic ethical writings. Jewish Publication Society. ISBN 978-0-8276-0681-4.
- Wright, R. (2008). Dreams and Shadows: The Future of the Middle East. Studies in Performance and Early Modern Drama. Penguin Group. ISBN 978-0-14-311489-5.
- Yatom, D. (26 February 1994). "Preliminary Report on the Events in Hebron as presented by Commanding Officer of the Central Command General Dani Yatom Before the Diplomatic Corps". MFA.
- Yiftachel, Oren; Roded, Batya (2010). "Abraham's Urban Footsteps: Political Geography and Religious Radicalism in Israel/Palestine". In AlSayyad, Nezar; Massoumi, Mejgan (eds.). The Fundamentalist City?: Religiosity and the Remaking of Urban Space. Routledge. ISBN 978-1-136-92121-6.
- Zacharia, J. (8 March 2010). "Letter from the West Bank: In Hebron, renovation of holy site sets off strife". The Washington Post.
- Zbeedat, Nagham (8 April 2024). "West Bank Palestinians Are Also Going Hungry. This 800 Year-old Soup Kitchen Is Stepping Up". Haaretz.
- "Hebron". Palestine and Syria. Leipsig: Karl Baedeker. 1876.
- Macalister, Robert Alexander Stewart (1911). "Hebron" . Encyclopædia Britannica. Vol. 13 (11th ed.). pp. 192–193.
- "Hebron". Handbook for Travellers in Syria and Palestine. London: J. Murray. 1858. OCLC 2300777.
