= Russian Orthodox properties in Palestine =

Russian Orthodox properties in Palestine refers to real-estate owned by the Russian Orthodox Church (ROC) in the State of Palestine.

== History ==
=== 1840s up to Russian Revolution ===
While the first Russian Orthodox archimandrite arrived in Palestine in 1844, Russia's focus on the area began when Napoleon III took over control of France in an 1851 coup d'état and moved to seize control of properties in the Holy Land held by members of the Greek Orthodox Church (GOC). The court of the Czar had long held itself to be the main patron and protector of Orthodoxy, especially after most of the membership of the Greek Orthodox Church from 1460 until 1821 fell under the control of the Islamic Ottoman Empire (with its oppressive Devshirmeh and jizya laws). Through diplomacy and a show of force Napoleon III forced the Ottoman Empire to recognize France as the "sovereign authority" in the Holy Land. This moved control of many Christian holy sites and buildings out of Orthodox hands and under Catholicism. These events were one of the main triggers for the Crimean War of 1856. Despite defeat in the war by 1856, Russia continued actively pursuing its interests vis-à-vis the position and influence of the Ottoman Empire and its European allies. Czar Alexander II continually worked to make sure Russia would have a presence in Palestine. Towards these ends a consulate was created in 1858.

The Czar also funded the work of Constantin von Tischendorf in finding the Codex Sinaiticus at the Saint Catherine's Monastery at the foot of Mount Sinai. The Czar's brother, the Grand Duke Constantine, and his wife the Princess Alexandra toured the area at this time. Significantly it was also around this period that Bishop Euspensy began missionary work in the area (his detractors claim he was "a czarist agent" with a "scheme of wresting the Jerusalem patriarchate away from the church's liturgical twin, the Greek Orthodox Church."). Euspensy's efforts did not produce much but a few Christian Arab converts switching from the GOC to the ROC.

The Russian government began using its diplomatic influence to persuade the Ottoman sultans to refuse the berat to candidates for patriarch to any GOC bishop that disagreed with them. By 1860 the Russian Palestine Society was founded. The society guided pilgrims to the Holy Land and bought property in Jerusalem and Nazareth. In addition it ran a theological seminary that also focused on teaching politics. The Russian Palestine Society built hospices for Russian pilgrims and churches (where the liturgy was in Slavonic) all over the country "to the great annoyance of the Greek patriarchal element." The ROC soon attracted more Arab Christians as it championed the idea that local Arab clergy should be promoted to bishops and hierarchs instead of having clergy from Greece imported and put in authority over them. Also in the 1860s the Russians began building an extensive group of buildings outside the city of Jerusalem on Jaffa road, known as the Russian Compound.

These consisted of a large and elaborate church where the Russian archimandrite officiated, massive hostels for the pilgrims, a hospital and several other buildings capable of housing 1000 pilgrims, all within walking distance of the Russian consulate headquarters at the time. The ROC also built an ornate church at Gethsemane, and another at the site where their tradition holds that Jesus made his Ascension at the Mount of Olives. Another Russian hospice was built in the Muristan, along with an asylum for the insane, and schools. Russian pilgrimages were not only encouraged, but even subsidized by the Czar's government. At the time both Russia's political enemies and many within the GOC saw these projects as an intrigue of the Czar to make himself "a center of the Greek faith [i.e. Orthodoxy] which should rival Rome itself." This would all change with the fall of the Russian monarchy.

=== After the Russian Revolution ===
With the rise of the communists most of the church properties in Palestine remained in the hands of those at odds with the Bolsheviks, and the majority of these joined with the Russian Orthodox Church Outside Russia (ROCOR). Some properties of the ROC remained completely closed until 1941, when the Politburo ordered the churches reopened. An invitation was extended by the Soviets for all Orthodox prelates in the Middle East to come to Moscow to witness the installation of Patriarch Alexei I.

In 1952 the Soviets reopened the Russian Palestine Society under the direction of Communist Party agents from Moscow, replaced Archimandrite Vladimir with communist trained Ignaty Polikarp, and won over many Christian Arabs with communist sympathies to the ROC. The members of other branches of Orthodoxy refused to associate with the Soviet led ROC in Palestine.

=== Eviction by the Palestinian Authority ===
In 1997 Patriarch of Moscow Alexei II attempted to visit a ROCOR held monastery in Hebron with Yasser Arafat. It has been noted that "The Moscow-based church has enjoyed a close relationship with Arafat since his guerilla fighter days." Upon arrival Arafat and the patriarch were refused entry by the ROCOR clergy, who held that Alexy had no legitimate authority. Two weeks afterwards police officers of the Palestinian Authority arrived and by "assaulting and cursing priests and nuns" they managed to evict the ROCOR clergy and then turned over the property to the ROC. ROCOR Mother Superior Juliana said "We were told you have to leave because this man has to come here. This man was from the red church [i.e. the ROC]." Another nun stated "They put me on the floor and they dragged me like a sack of potatoes."

Alexy made another visit in early January 2000 to meet with Arafat and asked "for help in recovering church properties" as part of a "worldwide campaign to recover properties lost to churches that split off during the Communist era". Later that month the Palestinian Authority again moved to evict ROCOR clergy, this time from the 2.91-acre (11,800 m^{2}) Jericho Gardens with a Chapel. Five ROCOR monks and two nuns were forcibly removed from the property and ROC clergy took their places. The monks and nuns who were evicted said that they had been "badly manhandled." A monk claimed he was "knocked to the ground, handcuffed and beaten." The ROCOR clergy stated that "the police refused to produce any documentation" and all seven of the ROCOR evictees required hospitalization. The claims that the PA police used force were disputed by Palestinian Security Chief Jibril Rajoub "This is not true. It did not happen. It will never happen in the future. ...As the responsible authority in Hebron and all parts of the West Bank, we have the right to do our best to help them [the ROC]."

The eviction of the ROCOR clergy at the Jericho Gardens (with a Chapel) gained international attention because two ROCOR nuns who were American citizens managed to sneak into the confiscated monastery and barricade themselves inside a portion of the complex. Further media attention became focused on the event when it was discovered that one of the nuns was Maria Stephanopoulos the sibling of George Stephanopoulos the former advisor to U.S. President Bill Clinton.

As the nuns were American citizens the U.S. Consulate in East Jerusalem became involved to ensure their safety. When Arafat visited the US while the incident was ongoing the subject was raised by Secretary of State Madeleine Albright. The office of Israeli Prime Minister Benjamin Netanyahu denounced the PA raid, saying it "violated the Israeli-Palestinian peace agreements under which both sides are to respect holy sites."

After confining herself to a section of the monastery without running water for over 60 days Sister Maria Stephanopoulos (who began limiting herself to a bread and water diet as a form of hunger strike) appealed to Pope John Paul II (who was making a historic visit in the area) to use his influence on Arafat to resolve the conflict, she said "I would hope this issue's going to resonate with him. He was in Poland and he really had a lot to do with the downfall of communism there, so he should certainly understand." Roman Catholic Bishop and the Vatican's ambassador to Jerusalem Kamal Bathish stated bluntly that the pope would not meet with Sister Maria or intervene on her behalf.

Sister Maria complained of "brusque treatment at the hands of the Palestinian Authority guards" and being "harassed by the Moscow Patriarchate monks who occupy the other half of the compound." In an address to reporters her sibling, George Stephanopoulos, stated that he planned to meet with her in Hebron, and said "My greatest concern, as her brother, is that Sr. Maria remains safe and healthy, and I admire her determination." An agreement brokered by U.S. Rep. Carolyn Maloney, Rep. Tom Lantos and Sen. Daniel Patrick Moynihan with the PA, the U.S. consulate and the Moscow Patriarchate was made to allow Sister Maria and Sister Xenia Cesena greater access to the entire property, especially the monastery's chapel. Despite this, Sister Maria stated that the ROC monks were still preventing her from worshiping in the chapel, "Anytime we get close they close the door in our face. There's no such thing as equal access." She told reporters she had no intention of relenting, saying "I believe in the new martyrs, what they stood for. The freedom of the church in the end is what it's about."

=== Current Situation ===
Today, both the ROC and ROCOR have a continued, and separate existence in the Holy Land, but the 2007 signing of the Act of Canonical Communion has brought about a new era of cooperation between the two parts of the Russian Church.

== List of properties ==
=== Church of Russia/Moscow Patriarchate (ROC) ===
- Baptismal site in Jordan: Russian Pilgrims' Residence
- Bethlehem: Russian Pilgrims' Residence
- Hebron: Abraham's Oak Holy Trinity Monastery, with the Church of Holy Forefathers (held by ROCOR from ca. 1917-1997. In 1997 Palestinian police turned it over to ROC.)
- Jericho: Metochion of St. John the Baptist

N.B. the Russian Compound (with the Holy Trinity Cathedral and the Church of St. Alexandra the Martyr Queen) in West Jerusalem is the historical center of the Russian Orthodox presence in Jerusalem and the Russian Orthodox Ecclesiastical Mission in Jerusalem

=== Russian Orthodox Church Outside Russia (ROCOR) ===
The list might be incomplete.

- Jerusalem: the Convent and Church of Mary Magdalene.
- Jerusalem: the Convent of the Ascension, with a church and bell tower. It is on the Mount of Olives, near the Chapel of the Ascension (which is not an Orthodox property).
- Wadi Faran (Wadi Qelt): Skete of Saint Chariton (see here:)

== See also ==
- White Emigre
- Russian Compound in Jerusalem
- Russian Orthodox Ecclesiastical Mission in Jerusalem
