= Russian Orthodox Church in Israel =

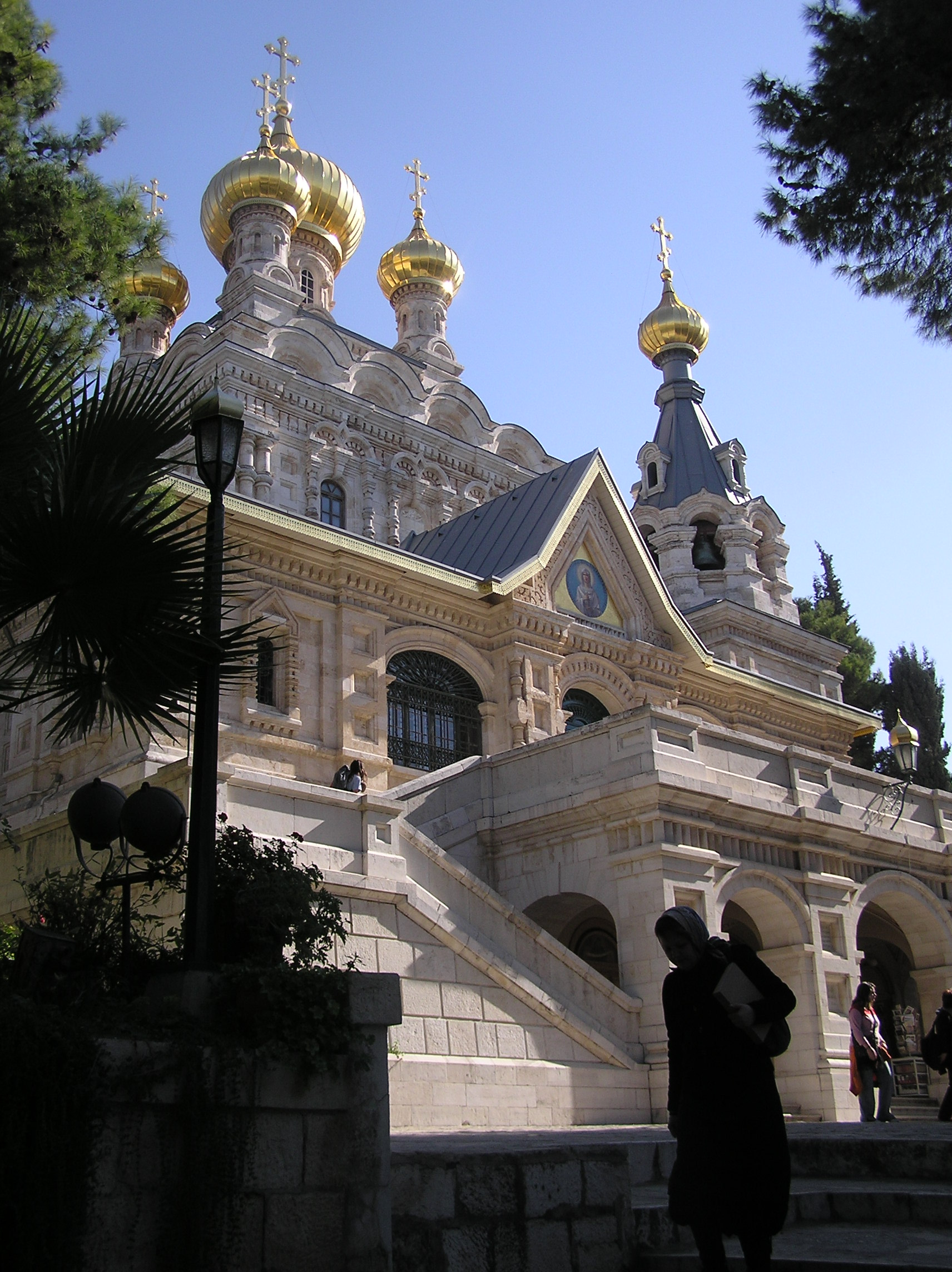
Church of St. Mary Magdalene, Jerusalem

Russian Orthodox properties in Israel refers to real-estate owned by the Russian Orthodox Church (ROC) in Israel.

== History ==
=== 1840s up to Russian Revolution ===
While the first Russian Orthodox archimandrite arrived in Palestine in 1844, Russia's focus on the area began when Napoleon III took over control of France in an 1851 coup d'état and moved to seize control of properties in the Holy Land held by members of the Greek Orthodox Church (GOC). The court of the Czar had long held itself to be the main patron and protector of Orthodoxy, especially after most of the membership of the Greek Orthodox Church from 1460 until 1821 fell under the control of the Islamic Ottoman Empire (with its Devshirmeh and jizya laws). Through diplomacy and a show of force Napoleon III forced the Ottoman Empire to recognize France as the "sovereign authority" in the Holy Land. This moved control of many Christian holy sites and buildings out of Orthodox hands and under Catholicism. These events were one of the main triggers for the Crimean War of 1856. Despite defeat in the war by 1856, Russia continued actively pursuing its interests vis-à-vis the position and influence of the Ottoman Empire and its European allies. Czar Alexander II continually worked to make sure Russia would have a presence in Palestine. Towards these ends a consulate was created in 1858.

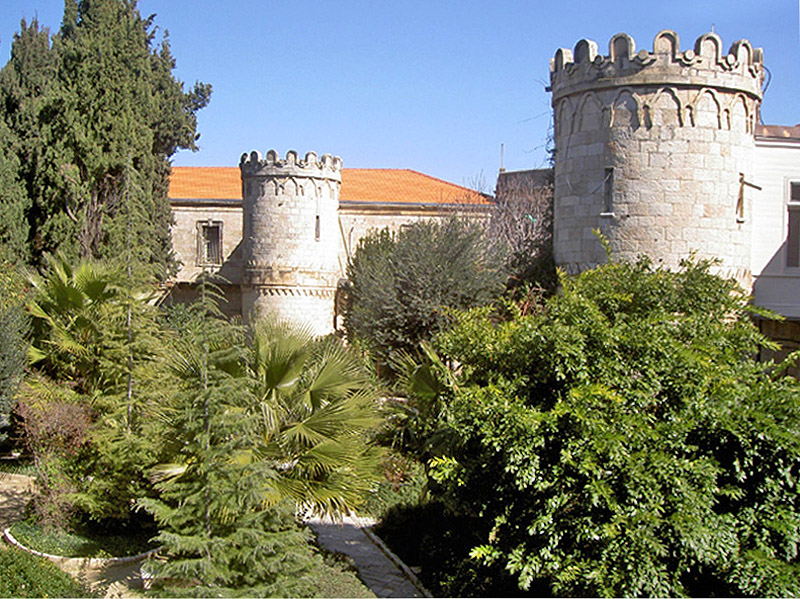
Sergei Court, Jerusalem

The Czar also funded the work of Constantin von Tischendorf in finding the Codex Sinaiticus at the Saint Catherine's Monastery at the foot of Mount Sinai. The Czar's brother, the Grand Duke Constantine, and his wife the Princess Alexandra toured the area at this time. Significantly it was also around this period that Bishop Euspensy began missionary work in the area (his detractors claim he was "a czarist agent" with a "scheme of wresting the Jerusalem patriarchate away from the church's liturgical twin, the Greek Orthodox Church."). Euspensy's efforts did not produce much but a few Christian Arab converts switching from the GOC to the ROC.

The Russian government began using its diplomatic influence to persuade the Ottoman sultans to refuse the berat to candidates for patriarch to any GOC bishop that disagreed with them. By 1860 the Russian Palestine Society was founded. The society guided pilgrims to the Holy Land and bought property in Jerusalem and Nazareth. In addition it ran a theological seminary that also focused on teaching politics. The Russian Palestine Society built hospices for Russian pilgrims and churches (where the liturgy was in Slavonic) all over the country "to the great annoyance of the Greek patriarchal element." The ROC soon attracted more Arab Christians as it championed the idea that local Arab clergy should be promoted to bishops and hierarchs instead of having clergy from Greece imported and put in authority over them. Also in the 1860s the Russians began building an extensive group of buildings outside the city of Jerusalem on Jaffa road, known as the Russian Compound.

These consisted of a large and elaborate church where the Russian archimandrite officiated, massive hostels for the pilgrims, a hospital and several other buildings capable of housing 1000 pilgrims, all within walking distance of the Russian consulate headquarters at the time. The ROC also built an ornate church at Gethsemane, and another at the site where their tradition holds that Jesus made his Ascension at the Mount of Olives. Another Russian hospice was built in the Muristan, along with an asylum for the insane, and schools. Russian pilgrimages were not only encouraged, but even subsidized by the Czar's government. At the time both Russia's political enemies and many within the GOC saw these projects as an intrigue of the Czar to make himself "a center of the Greek faith [i.e. Orthodoxy] which should rival Rome itself." This would all change with the fall of the Russian monarchy.

=== After the Russian Revolution ===
With the rise of the communists most of the church properties in Palestine remained in the hands of those at odds with the Bolsheviks, and the majority of these joined with the Russian Orthodox Church Outside Russia (ROCOR). Some properties of the ROC remained completely closed until 1941, when the Politburo ordered the churches reopened. An invitation was extended by the Soviets for all Orthodox prelates in the Middle East to come to Moscow to witness the installation of Patriarch Alexei I.

=== After Israeli Independence ===
When Israel became a state in 1948, all of the property under the control of the ROCOR within its borders was handed over to the Soviet dominated ROC in appreciation for Moscow's support of the Jewish state (this support was short-lived). The ROCOR maintained control over churches and properties in the Jordanian-ruled West Bank unmolested until the late 1980s.

In 1952 the Soviets reopened the Russian Palestine Society under the direction of Communist Party agents from Moscow, replaced Archimandrite Vladimir with communist trained Ignaty Polikarp, and won over many Christian Arabs with communist sympathies to the ROC. The members of other branches of Orthodoxy refused to associate with the Soviet led ROC in Palestine.

== List of properties ==
=== Church of Russia/Moscow Patriarchate (ROC) ===
- Baptismal site in Jordan, Russian Pilgrims Residence
- Jerusalem, the Russian Compound: the Holy Trinity Cathedral and the church of St. Alexandra the Martyr Queen
- Ein Karem, the Gorny Convent with three churches: the Cathedral of All Russian Saints, the Church of Our Lady of Kazan, and the cave church of St. John the Baptist
- Jaffa, Metochion of Righteous Tabitha with the church of St. Peter and St. Tabitha
- Haifa, the church of St. Elijah on Mount Carmel
- Tiberias, the monastery with the Church of St. Mary Magdalene
- Tiberias (road to Magdala), Metochion of St. Maria Magdalene in Magdala
- Tiberias (road to Magdala), Russian Pilgrims Residence

=== Russian Orthodox Church Outside Russia (ROCOR) ===
The list might be incomplete.

- Jerusalem, Convent and Church of Mary Magdalene.
- Jerusalem, the Mount of Olives Convent with the Russian Church of the Saviour's Ascension and its bell-tower.

== See also ==
- White émigré
- Russian Compound in Jerusalem
- Russian Orthodox Ecclesiastical Mission in Jerusalem
- Russian Orthodox properties in the State of Palestine
