= Mamre =

Ancient religious site in Hebron

- Mambre. For Ramat el-Khalil site: Ramat el-Khalil, Ramet el-Khalil (Rāmet el-Ḥalīl), Haram Ramet el-Khalil, Haram er-Rama, Haram al-Rama, Beit Khalil er-Rahman, Beit el-Khalil ('Abraham's House')
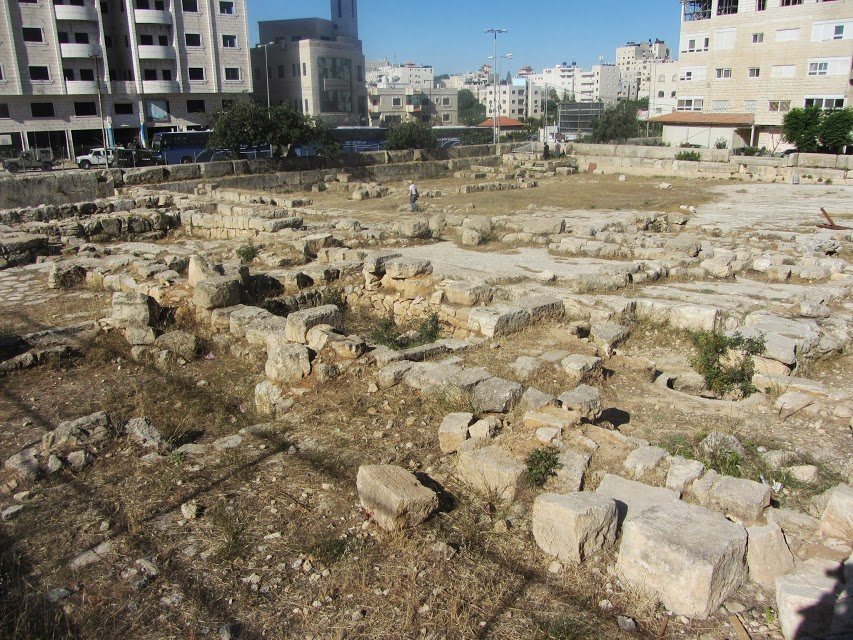
- Archaeological remains at Ramat el-Khalil

- Location within the West Bank
- 31.556536°N 35.105336°E
- Location: Hebron, Judea

History
- Built: Ramat el-Khalil site: doubtful according to latest data: 9th–8th century BCE, Kingdom of Judah; 1st century BCE, Herod the Great; 130 CE, Emperor Hadrian; 324 CE, Constantine the Great; doubtful: 12th century, Crusaders

Site notes
- Archaeologists: Ramat el-Khalil: Andreas Evaristus Mader (1926–1928), Sayf al-Din Haddad (1977), 'Abd el-Aziz Arjub (1984–1985), Yitzhak Magen (1986–1988)

Mamre (/ˈmæmri/; Hebrew: מַמְרֵא), full name "Oaks of Mamre", refers to an ancient religious site originally focused on a single holy tree growing "since time immemorial" at Hebron in Canaan. It is best known from the biblical story of Abraham and the three visitors. He pitched his tents at the site, which is known as the oak or terebinth of Mamre. Modern scholars have identified four sites near Hebron which, in different historical periods, could have been successively known as Mamre: Khirbet Nimra, also known as Ayn Nimreh, (a little-excavated Persian and Hellenistic period site, a hypothetical identification, not proven by any archaeological finds), Ramat el-Khalil, also known as Haram er-Rama (the best known site, flourished from the Herodian through the Byzantine period), Deir Al Arba'een complex, and Khirbet es-Sibte. The last one contained an old oak tree identified by a relatively new tradition as the Oak of Mamre, which collapsed in 2019, and is on the grounds of the Church of the Holy Forefathers and Monastery of the Holy Trinity. There is a rather recent hypothesis (neither archaeologically nor in any other way confirmed) that at the location of Khirbet Nimra, a tree cult predated the biblical narrative.

Jewish-Roman historian Josephus, as well as Christian and Jewish sources from the Byzantine period, locate Mamre at the site later renamed in Arabic as Ramat el-Khalil, 4 km north of historical Hebron and approximately halfway between that city and Halhul. Herod the Great initiated the Jewish identification of the site with Mamre, by erecting there a monumental enclosure. It was one of the three most important fairs or marketplaces in Judea, where the fair was held next to the venerated tree accompanied by an interdenominational festival celebrated by Jews, pagans, and Christians alike. This prompted Emperor Constantine the Great to unsuccessfully stop this practice by erecting a Christian basilica there.

== Hebrew Bible ==
=== Names and events ===
Mamre is the site where Abraham pitched tents for his camp and built an altar, following his separation from Lot, his nephew, and where he was brought divine tidings in the guise of three angels who promised that Sarah, his wife, would become pregnant in Genesis 18:1-15.

Genesis 13:18 reports that Abraham settled "near the great trees of Mamre at Hebron". The original Hebrew tradition appears, to judge from a textual variation conserved in the Septuagint, to have referred to a single great oak tree, which Josephus called Ogyges. Mamre may have been an Amorite, a tribal chieftain after whom a grove of trees was named. Genesis connected it with Hebron or a place nearby that city. Mamre has frequently been associated with the Cave of the Patriarchs. According to one scholar, there is considerable confusion in the Biblical narrative concerning not only Mamre, but also Machpelah, Hebron and Kiryat Arba, all four of which are aligned repeatedly. In Genesis, Mamre is also identified with Hebron itself (Genesis 23:19, 25:27). The Christian tradition of identifying a ruined site surrounded by walls and called in Arabic Rāmet el-Ḥalīl ('Hill of the Friend', meaning: "the friend of God", i.e. Abraham), with the Old Testament Mamre, goes back to the earliest Christian pilgrims in the 4th century CE, and connects to a tradition from the time of Herod (1st century BCE).

In Genesis 14:13, the text refers to "the terebinth trees of Mamre the Amorite", an ally or friend of Abraham, Mamre being the name of one of the three Amorite chiefs who joined forces with those of Abraham in pursuit of Chedorlaomer to save Lot in Genesis 14:13, 24. The supposed discrepancy is often explained as reflecting the discordance between the different scribal traditions behind the composition of the Torah, the former relating to the Yahwist, the latter to the Elohist recension, according to the classic formulation of the documentary hypothesis.

Abraham's son Isaac moved to Beer-lahai-roi after his father's death, but later moved to Gerar due to a famine. However, he ended his days in Mamre, and it was there that Jacob met with him at the end of his life.

== Identification ==
There appear to be four main sites which have been known, at different times in history, as Mamre. These are, chronologically:

1. Khirbet Nimra or Ayn Nimreh, an archaeological site next to Hebron and 1.5 km south of Ramat el-Khalil, hypothetically identified by several researchers as the Mamre of Achaemenid Judea and the subsequent Hellenistic period, but not confirmed by any archaeological finds.
2. Ramat el-Khalil, also spelled Ramet el-Khulil, and also known as Haram er-Rama, is the site identified as Mamre in the time of King Herod (1st century BCE), Constantine the Great (4th century CE), and – strongly contested by some – the Crusader Kingdom of Jerusalem (12th–13th centuries CE). Talmudic sources refer to the site as Beth Ilanim or Botnah. The ruins of the Herodian and Constantinian structure also became known in Arabic as Beit el-Khalil "Abraham's House".
3. Deir el Arba'een: a tradition that flourished from the 16th century down to the commencement of the 19th century, now almost forgotten, pointed to the hill of Deir el Arba'een as that of Mamre, relying especially, no doubt, in its inception on the identity of Mamre and Hebron (Genesis 23:19Template:Bibleverse with invalid book). The site agrees well with the statement that the cave of Machpelah was "before," i.e. to the East of Mamre (Genesis 23:17Template:Bibleverse with invalid book). A magnificent terebinth which stood there was pointed out as that of Abraham.
4. Khirbet es-Sibte (also Ain Sebta), the present-day site of the so-called Oak of Mamre, 2 km southwest of Ramat el-Khalil, has been considered since the 19th century by Christians to be the place where Abraham saw the angels. A modern Russian Orthodox monastery is marking the site.

== History and archaeology ==
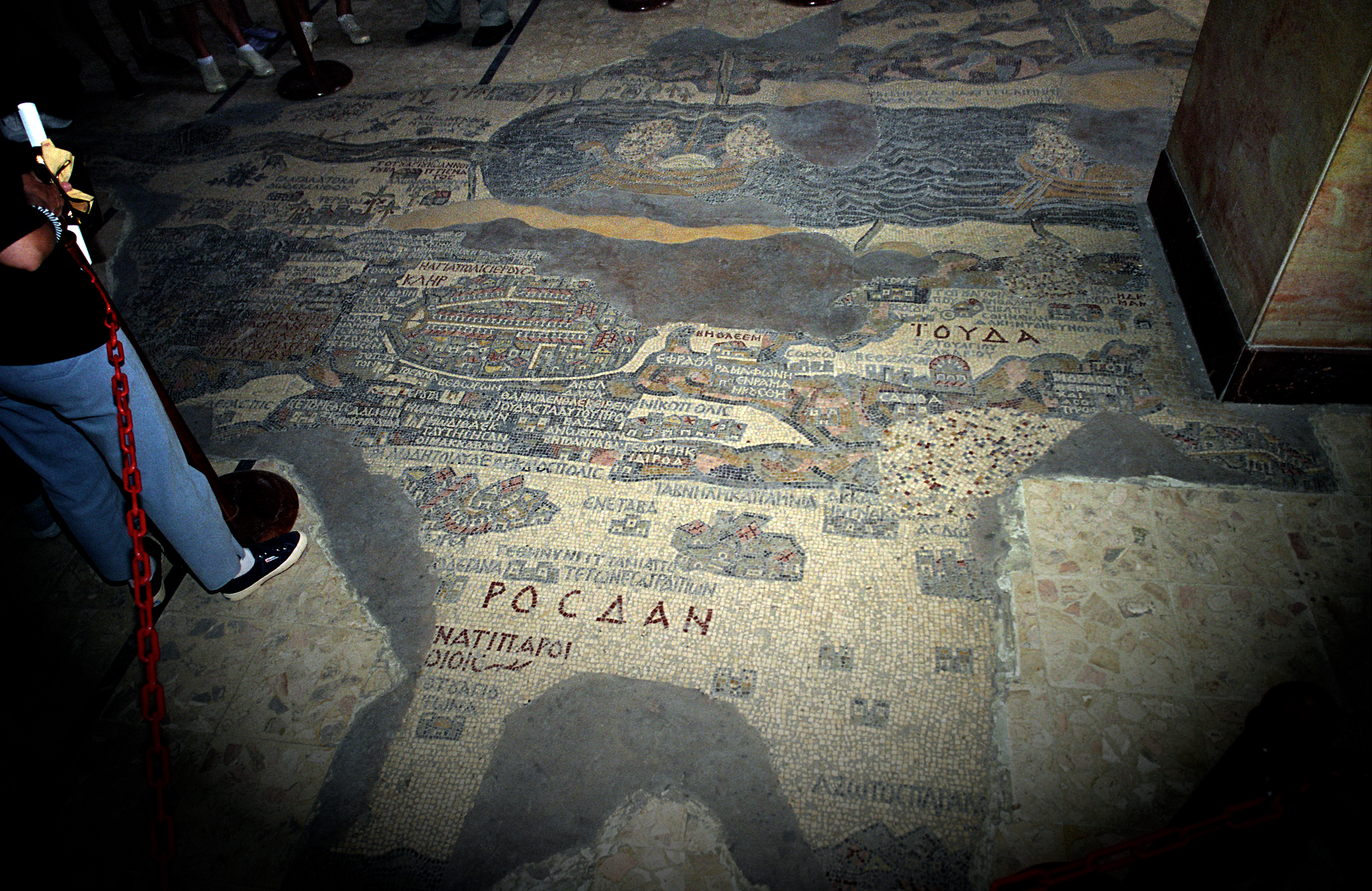
Mamre on Madaba Map

=== Khirbet Nimra ===
According to Abel and Jericke among others, Persian and Hellenistic Mamre was located at Khirbet Nimra, 2 km north of the Cave of Machpelah, inside modern Hebron, where a pagan tree cult, supposedly, predates the biblical Abraham narrative.

However, excavations at the archaeological site of Khirbet Nimra on the summit of Jebel Nimra did not prove Abel's supposition that this should be an ancient shrine: the archaeological team found only a Persian administrative building from the 6th–5th centuries BCE, that was later converted into an agricultural center, mainly for the manufacture of olive oil and textiles. The building was apparently destroyed during Alexander the Great's campaign, and was temporarily inhabited by rebels or refugees who had fled Jerusalem during the First Jewish Revolt against Rome. Abel's (and later Jericke's) hypothesis rests primarily on the linguistically probable assumption that "Nimra" is a corruption of "Mamre". Nonetheless, it seems that "Mamre" was not only an ancient name for Hebron (Gen. 23:19), but referred to the whole wider locality, including the Jebel Nimra mountain, as the Cave of Machpelah is on its western slope, while to its west Nahạl Hebron bisects the city of Hebron.

Besides, Jericke's equation of Khirbet Nimra with a highly hypothetical original tree shrine from the Persian and Hellenistic periods led him to date the story of Abraham at Mamre to the Persian period, which was rejected by the majority of other researchers.

OpenBible.info, run by Crossway Bibles (a publishing ministry of Good News Publishers) rates the claim that Khirbet Nimra is Mamre as "very low confidence".

=== Ramat el-Khalil ===
==== Research and analysis ====
The archaeological site of Ramat el-Khalil (Grid Ref. 160300/107200) was first excavated by Andreas Evaristus Mader in 1926–1928, followed by Sayf al-Din Haddad (1977), 'Abd el-Aziz Arjub (1984–1985), and Yitzhak Magen (1986–1988), Magen publishing his findings in 1991 and 2003. Greenberg & Keinan, summarising previous dig reports, list the outstanding components of the site as being a large Roman-era enclosure, a Byzantine church, and a Crusader church.

However, Denys Pringle's analysis of both historical and archaeological sources leads to the firm conclusion that the Crusader-era Church of the Trinity, mentioned by pilgrims in 1170, stood at the foot of a hill, not at its top, and certainly not at Ramat el-Khalil, where the remains of the Constantinian church were found undisturbed by any later building in 1926.

Greenberg and Keinan list the main periods of settlement as Early Roman, Late Roman, Byzantine, and Crusader, with less substantial findings from the Iron Age IIc era (700—586 BCE) and the Hellenistic period. However, Yitzhak Magen, the last to excavate the site, claims that findings previously attributed to the biblical-era kings of the Iron Age, and the Hellenistic Hasmonean dynasty (r. 140 BC to 37 BC), are in fact of far newer date: Byzantine or later.

==== Bronze Age ====
Early Bronze Age pottery sherds found at the Ramat el-Khalil site may indicate that a cultic shrine of some kind was in use from 2600–2000 BCE, but there is no archaeological evidence for the site being occupied from the first half of the second millennium down to the end of the Iron Age – that is, very broadly speaking, between 2000 and 600 BCE.

==== Herod: the enclosure ====
Herod the Great transferred the Mamre tradition 2.5 km to the north, from the site at Khirbet Nimra (see above) to the site at Ramet el-Khalil. This was part of Herod's upgrade of Hebron as a cult centre dedicated to the patriarch Abraham, by erecting two shrines: one at Abraham's tomb, and one at a site he connected to his place of residence, where the patriarch dined under a tree together with the three men. It has been noted that Hebron and Mamre were located in Idumaean territory, that both Jews and Idumaeans regarded Abraham as their common ancestor, and that Herod came from an Idumaean family that had only recently converted to Judaism.

The 2 m thick stone wall enclosing an area 49 m wide and 65 m long was constructed by Herod, possibly as a cultic place of worship. It contained an ancient well, more than 5 m in diameter, referred to as Abraham's Well.

==== Josephus: the terebinth ====
Josephus (37 – c. 100) records a tradition according to which the terebinth at Mamre was as old as the world itself (War 4.534). The site was soaked in legend. Jews, Christians and Pagans made sacrifices on the site, burning animals, and the tree was considered immune to the flames of the sacrifices. Constantine the Great (r. 302–337) was still attempting, without success, to stop this tradition. Josephus's terebinth tree is distinct from the modern Oak of Mamre and stood at a different location.

==== Late Roman period: Hadrian's temple ====
The Herodian structure was destroyed by Simon bar Kokhba's army, only to be rebuilt by the Roman emperor Hadrian. Hadrian revived the fair, which had long been an important one as it took place at an intersection forming the transport and communications nub of the southern Judean mountains. This mercatus (Hebrew: יָרִיד, romanized: yāriḏ or שוק shuq): Koine Greek: πανήγυρις) or "fair, market" was one of the sites, according to a Jewish tradition conserved in Jerome, chosen by Hadrian to sell remnants of Bar Kochba's defeated army into slavery. Jerome, in his commentary on the Book of Jeremiah, writes:

But some of the Iudaei attach to this place the meaning that, after Jerusalem had been captured under Vespasian, along this road, to Gaza and Alexandria, endless thousands of captives were sent on the way to Rome. But others, that, at the final captivity under Hadrian, when the city of Jerusalem was destroyed, an innumerable crowd of various ages and both sexes was sold in the market at the Terebinth; and therefore it is hateful for Jews that this much-frequented market should flourish.

==== Rabbinical tradition ====
The Chazal, the early rabbis, condemned the fairs due to idolatry. According to the Jerusalem Talmud, Avodah Zarah 1:4:4:

Rebbi Yose ben Rebbi Abun came, Abba bar bar Ḥana in the name of Rebbi Joḥanan: They forbade only the fair at Botnah, as it was stated thus: There are three fairs, the fair at Gaza, the fair at Acco, the fair at Botnah [Betonim, east of the Jordan River]. The clearest of them is the fair at Botnah.

==== Late Roman festival and Byzantine basilica ====
Eusebius and Sozomen describe how, notwithstanding the rabbinic ban, by the time of Constantine the Great's reign (302–337), the market had become an informal interdenominational festival, in addition to its functions as a trade fair, frequented by Christians, Jews and pagans. The cultic shrine was made over for Christian use after Eutropia, Constantine's mother-in-law, visited it and was scandalised by its pagan character. Constantine, informed of these pagan practices, attempted without success to put an end to the festive rituals celebrated around the tree. He angrily wrote to Macarius, bishop of Jerusalem and all the other bishops of Palestine and admonished them, letting them know that he had ordered the comes Acacius to destroy all pagan idols and punish those holding on to pagan practices. The enclosure was then consecrated, Constantine had a basilica built, dedicated to Saint George (its foundations are still visible), and the enclosure of the Terebinth of Mamre roofed over.

The 1957 plan and reconstruction of the site made after the excavation performed by German scholar A. E. Mader in 1926–1928, shows the Constantinian basilica along the eastern wall of the Haram Ramet el-Khalil enclosure, with a well, altar, and tree in the unroofed western part of the enclosure.

The venerated tree was destroyed by Christian visitors taking souvenirs, leaving only a stump which survived down to the seventh century.

The fifth-century account by Sozomen (Historia Ecclesiastica Book II 4-54) is the most detailed account of the practices at Mamre during the early Christian period.

The place is presently called the Terebinth, and is situated at the distance of fifteen stadia from Hebron. ... There every year a very famous festival is held in the summer time, by people of the neighbourhood as well as by the inhabitants of more distant parts of Palestine and by Phoenicians and Arabians. Very many go there for the sake of business, some to sell and some to buy. The feast is celebrated by a very big congregation of Jews, since they boast of Abraham as their forefather, of heathens since angels came there, of Christians since he who should be born from the Virgin for the salvation of humankind appeared there to that pious man. Everyone venerates this place according to his religion: some praying [to] God the ruler of all, some calling upon the angels and offering libations of wine, burning incense or sacrificing an ox, a goat, a sheep or a cock. ... Constantine's mother in law (Euthropia), having gone there to fulfill a vow, gave notice of all this to the Emperor. So he wrote to the bishops of Palestine reproaching them for having forgot[ten] their mission and permitted (sic) such a most holy place to be defiled by those libations and sacrifices.'

A vignette of the Constantinian basilica with its colonnaded atrium appears on the 6th-century Madaba Map, under the partially preserved Greek caption "Arbo, also the Terebinth. The Oak of Mambre".

Antoninus of Piacenza in his Itinerarium, an account of his journey to the Holy Land (ca.570 CE) comments on the basilica, with its four porticoes, and an unroofed atrium. Both Christians and Jews worshipped there, separated by a small screen (cancellus). The Jewish worshippers would flock there to celebrate the deposition of Jacob and David on the day after the traditional date of Christ's birthday.

The Constantinian basilica was destroyed during the Sasanian conquest of Jerusalem of 614.

==== Early Muslim period ====
Arculf, a Frankish bishop who toured the Levant in around 670–680, witnessed the monastery still being active around 670, a few decades after Umar's conquest. He reported, indicating a slightly erroneous location in relation to the Tombs of the Patriarchs:

A mile to the north of the Tombs that have been described above, is the very grassy and flowery hill of Mambre, looking towards Hebron, which lies to the south of it. This little mountain, which is called Mambre, has a level summit, at the north side of which a great stone church has been built, in the right side of which between the two walls of this great Basilica, the Oak of Mambre, wonderful to relate, stands rooted in the earth; it is also called the oak of Abraham, because under it he once hospitably received the Angels. St. Hieronymus elsewhere relates, that this tree had existed from the beginning of the world to the reign of the Emperor Constantine; but he did not say that it had utterly perished, perhaps because at that time, although the whole of that vast tree was not to be seen as it had been formerly, yet a spurious trunk still remained rooted in the ground, protected under the roof of the church, of the height of two men; from this wasted spurious trunk, which has been cut on all sides by axes, small chips are carried to the different provinces of the world, on account of the veneration and memory of that oak, under which, as has been mentioned above, that famous and notable visit of the Angels was granted to the patriarch Abraham.

==== Crusader period ====
Yitzhak Magen was in 1993 of the opinion that during the Crusades, the site may have been used by a Church of the Trinity. Denys Pringle firmly refutes this possibility, based on the analysis of pilgrims' reports.

Avraham Negev considers the last clear identification and description of the Byzantine church remains at Ramat el-Khalil to come from the Russian pilgrim known as Abbot Daniel, who visited the site in 1106/8, and he qualifies other medieval reports from the 12th century onwards as not clear with regard to the location of the site they describe.

=== After 1150s: different Jewish and Christian locations ===
After the middle of the 12th century the reports become vague and the location of "Abraham's Oak" seems to have migrated to one or more locations situated on the road connecting Ramat el-Khalil with Hebron. What is nowadays considered the traditional location of the Oak of Abraham is a site originally known in Arabic as Ain Sebta, which used to be outside historical Hebron but is now within the urban sprawl of the Palestinian city.

As written in a footnote from an 1895 publication of Arculf's pilgrimage report,

The Oak or Terebinth of Abraham has been shown in two different sites. Arculf and many others (Jerome, Itin[erarium] Hierosol[ymitanum], Sozomen, Eucherius [possibly Eucherius of Lyon], Benjamin of Tudela, the Abbot Daniel,.... etc.) seem to point to the ruin of er Râmeh, near which is Beit el Khulil, or Abraham's House, with a fine spring well. This is still held by the Jews to be the Oak of Mamre. The Christians point to another site, Ballûtet Sebta, where [there] is a fine specimen of Sindian (Quercus Pseudococcifera)."

Ballut is the Arabic word for oak.

== Ramat el-Khalil today ==
The Palestinian authorities have made the site accessible to visitors under the name Haram Ramat Al Khalil.

The site was excavated by 20th-century Christian and Jewish archaeologists, and a 2015 initiative by the Palestinian Ministry of Tourism, joined by the UN and youth belonging to all three communities in the area—Muslim, Jewish, and Christian—restored the site for visitors and built a new "meeting centre". However, as of 2019, the centre had not yet been opened and the site itself doesn't see much traffic.

== See also ==
- Oak of Mamre, an ancient tree, situated about halfway between historical Mamre and Hebron, distinct from Josephus's "terebinth tree of Mamre" and the Constantinian site
- Church of the Holy Forefathers and Monastery of the Holy Trinity, a Russian Orthodox monastery located at what a more recent tradition identifies as the "Oak of Mamre"
- The Mamre Institute, an Israeli research institute aimed at providing accurate access to Jewish religious texts, including the Hebrew Bible, presented in both Hebrew and English.

== Bibliography ==
- Adler, William (2013). The Kingdom of Edessa and the Creation of a Christian Aristocracy. In Natalie B. Dohrmann, Annette Yoshiko Reed (eds.) Jews, Christians, and the Roman Empire: The Poetics of Power in Late Antiquity, University of Pennsylvania Press, pp. 43–62 p. 57.
- Adamnanus, De Locis Sanctis – see Macpherson translation
- Alter, Robert (1997). Genesis: Translation and Commentary. New York, London: W. W. Norton & Co. p. 60. ISBN 9780393070262.
- Drbal, Vlastimil (2017). "Pilgrimage and multi-religious worship: Palestinian Mamre in Late Antiquity". In Kristensen, Troels Myrup; Friese, Wiebke (eds.). Excavating Pilgrimage: Archaeological Approaches to Sacred Travel and Movement in the Ancient World. Routledge Studies in Pilgrimage, Religious Travel and Tourism. Taylor & Francis. pp. 245–264 (247). ISBN 9781351856263.
- Eusebius. Life of Constantine. Averil Cameron and Stuart George Hall (tr., ed.), Oxford University Press (1999) ISBN 0-19-814917-4
- Fergusson, James (2004) [1873]. Tree and Serpent Worship: Or Illustrations of Mythology and Art in India in the First and Fourth Centuries After Christ. London: India Museum. p. 7. ISBN 81-206-1236-1 – via 2004 reprint of the 1873 second edition by Asian Educational Services, New Delhi.
- Frazer, James George (2003). Folklore in the Old Testament Studies in Comparative Religion Legend and Law: Studies in Comparative Religion, Legend, and Law Kessinger Publishing''. ISBN 0-7661-3238-2
- Gitlitz, David M.; Davidson, Linda Kay (2006). Pilgrimage and the Jews. Westport, CT: Praeger. ISBN 9780275987633.
- Greenberg, Raphael; Keinan, Adi (2009). Israeli Archaeological Activity in the West Bank and East Jerusalem 1967-2007: A Sourcebook (PDF). Ostracon Press. p. 130. ISBN 978-965-91468-0-2. Archived from the original on 29 September 2012.
- Haran, Menahem (1985). Temples and Temple-Service in Ancient Israel. Eisenbrauns, ISBN 0-931464-18-8, p. 53.
- Horne, Thomas Hartwell (1856). An Introduction to the Critical Study and Knowledge of the Holy Scriptures''. Longman, Brown, Green, Longmans & Roberts
- Heyden, Katharina (2020). "Construction, Performance, and Interpretation of a Shared Holy Place: The Case of Late Antique Mamre (Rāmat al-Khalīl)". Entangled Religions. 11 (1). doi:10.13154/er.11.2020.8557. S2CID 225915645.
- Heyden, Katharina (2016). "Hain der Religionen: Das Abrahamsheiligtum von Mamre als Begegnungsort und locus theologicus". Fremdenliebe – Fremdenangst: Zwei akademische Reden zur interreligiösen Begegnungin Spätantike und Gegenwart (in German). Theologischer Verlag Zürich (TVZ). p. 21 (with footnote 10). ISBN 9783290178635.
- Himzi, Hananya (2008). Jebel Nimra. Vol. 5 (supplementary volume). Jerusalem: The Israel Exploration Society. pp. 1797–1798.
- Horne, Thomas Hartwell (1856). An Introduction to the Critical Study and Knowledge of the Holy Scriptures. Longman, Brown, Green, Longmans & Roberts, p. 63.
- Jacobs, Andrew S. Remains of the Jews: The Holy Land and Christian Empire in Late Antiquity. Stanford University Press, 2004.
- Jericke, Detlef (2003). Abraham in Mamre: Historische und exegetische Studien zur Region von Hebron und zu Genesis 11, 27-19, 38 [Abraham in Mamre: Historical and Exegetical Studies on the Hebron Region and on Genesis 11, 27-19, 38]. Culture and History of the Ancient Near East, Volume 17 (in German). Leiden NL: BRILL. ISBN 90-04-12939-1.
- Jericke, Detlef (2023). Abraham in Mamre. Leiden, Boston: Brill. ISBN 978-90-04-12939-9.
- Letellier, Robert Ignatius (1995). Day in Mamre, Night in Sodom: Abraham and Lot in Genesis 18 and 19. BRILL, ISBN 90-04-10250-7
- Lipschits, Oded; Römer, Thomas; Gonzalez, Hervé (2017). "The Pre-Priestly Abraham Narratives from Monarchic to Persian Times". Semitica (59): 261–296.
- Louth, Andrew & Oden, Thomas C. & Conti, Marco. Ancient Christian Commentary on Scripture: Old Testament. InterVarsity Press ISBN 0-8308-1472-8, pp60–66
- Macpherson, James Rose (tr., ed.) (1895). "Arculf's Narrative about the Holy Places, Written by Adamnan. Book I: X.–The Hill and the Oak of Mambre.". The Pilgrimage of Arculfus in the Holy Land (About the Year A.D. 670). PPTS Publications. Vol. 33. London: Palestine Pilgrims' Text Society (PPTS). pp. 33–34, fn. 1.
- Mader, Andreas Evaristus (1954). Mambre. Die Ergebnisse der Ausgrabungen im heiligen Bezirk Râmet el-Ḫalîl in Südpalästina 1926–1928. 2 volumes, Erich Wewel Verlag, Freiburg im Breisgau, in German.
- Magen, Itzhaq (1993). The New Encyclopedia of Archaeological Excavations in the Holy Land, Jerusalem, via www.quondam.com, re-accessed 19 October 2021.
- Magen, Itzhaq; Duval, Noël; Donner, Herbert; Bagatti, Bellarmino; Di Segni, Leah (2000). "Arbo, also the Terebinth. The Oak of Mambre - (Ramat al-Khalil)". The Madaba Map: a virtual travel through the Holy Places. Studium Biblicum Franciscanum - Jerusalem. Archived from the original on 6 March 2018.
- Murphy-O'Connor, Jerome (2008). The Holy Land: An Oxford Archaeological Guide from Earliest Times to 1700. Oxford Archaeological Guides. Oxford: Oxford University Press. p. 370. ISBN 978-0-19-923666-4.
- Negev, Avraham; Gibson, Shimon (2001). "Mamre (Plain of), and Ramat el-Khalil". Archaeological Encyclopedia of the Holy Land. New York and London: Continuum. pp. 312–313, 427–428. ISBN 0-8264-1316-1.
- Netzer, Ehud and Laureys-Chachy, Rachel (2006). The Architecture of Herod, the Great Builder. Mohr Siebeck, ISBN 3-16-148570-X, p. 231
- Neusner, Jacob (1982). Abodah Zarah: A Preliminary Translation and Explanation. The Talmud of the Land of Israel, Volume 33. University of Chicago Press. pp. 29-30 quoting Rabbi Yohanan, Avodah Zarah, 1:4, 39d. ISBN 9780226576930.
- Niesiolowski-Spano, Lukasz (2016). The Origin Myths and Holy Places in the Old Testament: A Study of Aetiological Narratives, Routledge, p. 132.
- "Modern locations of places in the Bible: Khirbet Nimreh". OpenBible.info. Crossway Bibles (a publishing ministry of Good News Publishers). 2026.
- Pagolu, Augustine (1998). The Religion of the Patriarchs, A&C Black, pp. 59-60.
- Pringle, D. (1998). The Churches of the Crusader Kingdom of Jerusalem: L-Z (excluding Tyre). Vol. II. Cambridge University Press. ISBN 0-521-39037-0.
- Richardson, Peter (1996). Herod: king of the Jews and friend of the Romans. Studies on personalities of the New Testament. University of South Carolina Press. pp. 61–62. ISBN 9781570031366.
- Rosenfield, Ben-Zion; Joseph Menirav, Chava Cassel. Markets and Marketing in Roman Palestine. Brill, 2005 ISBN 90-04-14049-2
- Robinson, Edward. Biblical Researches in Palestine, 1838-52: A Journal of Travels in the Year 1838. pp. 215–216.
- Rozenfeld, Ben Tsiyon (2005). Markets And Marketing in Roman Palestine. BRILL. p. 63. ISBN 90-04-14049-2.
- Safrai, Ze'ev (1994). The Economy of Roman Palestine. Routledge. ISBN 0-415-10243-X.
- Stanley, Arthur Penrhyn (1856). Sinai and Palestine, in Connection with Their History. J. Murray, London
- Stavrakopoulou, Francesca (2011). Land of Our Fathers: The Roles of Ancestor Veneration in Biblical Land Claims. Bloomsbury Publishing USA, pp. 51-52: "Throughout Genesis, all these toponyms crowd the ancestral burial site, jostling for recognition. Though it is often assumed these were all essentially the same place, the aligning, glossing or renaming of locations is frequently suggestive of changing or competing claims to ownership."
- Taylor, Joan E. (1993). "Mamre". Christians and the Holy Places: The Myth of Jewish-Christian Origins. Oxford University Press. ISBN 0-19-814785-6.
- Mills, Watson E. & Bullard, Roger Aubrey (1998). Mercer Dictionary of the Bible. Mercer University Press, ISBN 0-86554-373-9
