= Russian Orthodox Ecclesiastical Mission in Jerusalem =

The Russian Orthodox Ecclesiastical Mission in Jerusalem (Russian: Русская духовная миссия в Иерусалиме, lit. 'Russian Ecclesiastical Mission in Jerusalem') was founded in the 19th century to serve as a representation of the Russian Orthodox Church to the Greek Orthodox Church of Jerusalem and to oversee the facilities caring for the thousands of pilgrims then flocking to the Holy Land from the Russian Empire.

== History ==
=== 1847-1920 ===
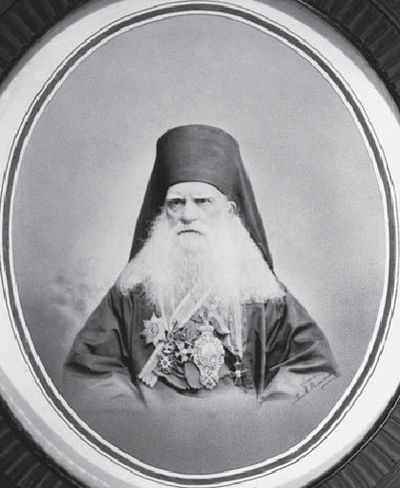
Porphyrius Uspensky

The first Russian Orthodox Ecclesiastical Mission in Jerusalem was sent in 1847 under the leadership of Archimandrite Porphyrius Uspensky, but was not recognized by the Ottoman Turkish government that at that time ruled Palestine. This first mission was sent to conduct archaeological research and organize pilgrimages from Russia to the Holy Land. The outbreak of the Crimean War between the Ottoman Empire and Russia, however, led to the return of the Mission's members to Russia.

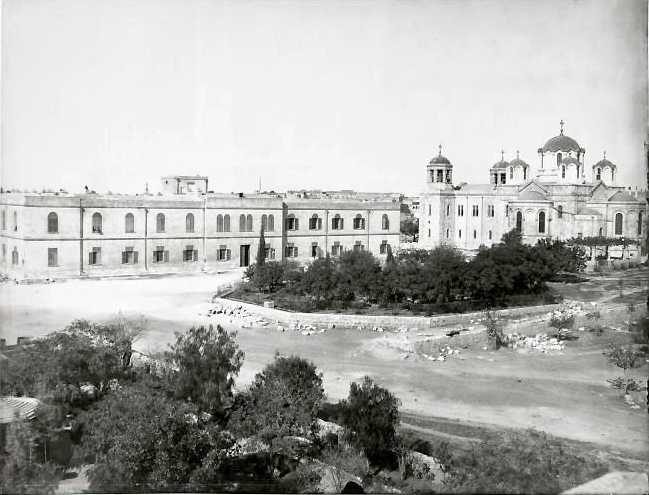
Russian Compound and the Holy Trinity Cathedral

In 1857 that the Mission returned with the official recognition of the Ottoman Turkish government. The Mission resumed its previous work of organizing pilgrimages from Russia to Palestine and also began sponsoring charitable and educational work amongst the Orthodox Christian Arabs forming the majority of the membership of the Orthodox Church of Jerusalem.

The restored Mission was led by Bishop Cyril Naumov of Melitopol and arrived in Jerusalem in January 1858. He was succeeded by Archimandrite Leonid Kavelin, under whose leadership the Mission transferred its headquarters from its first home at Holy Archangels' Monastery to its own property, now known as Jerusalem's Russian Compound.

Under Fr. Leonid's successor, renowned Byzantologist Antonin Kapustin, the Mission significantly expanded its presence in Palestine, acquiring multiple properties. Among other properties Fr. Antonin acquired the land on which the Oak of Mamre stands, the summit of the Mount of Olives, and the tomb of St. Tabitha in Jaffa.

Fr. Antonin's work, which continued to be supported by the imperial government in Russia, was continued by his successors, Archimandrites Raphael Trukhin, Alexander Golovin, Leonid Sentsov. During their tenures new lands were acquired in Bethany and Hebron as well as elsewhere in Palestine. From 1882 the Mission was assisted in its work by the Imperial Orthodox Palestine Society.

The start of World War I froze the work of the Mission. As Russia and Ottoman Turkey were on opposite sides of the conflict the beginning of the war saw the expulsion of Fr. Leonid together with all the clergy and staff of the Mission and the closing of its churches, although not of its monasteries and convents. In 1919 with the establishment of the British Mandate for Palestine the Mission's personnel were able to return from Egypt.

Due to Fr. Leonid's repose in 1918 Fr. Meletius, the Mission's second in command, took charge of its administration. As a result of the war and the Bolshevik Revolution the Mission's funding almost completely disappeared, as did the flow of pilgrims from the former Russian Empire. Despite the privations suffered by the Mission it was able to reopen the churches and even start a new school for girls in Bethany, establish the Gethsemane Convent of St. Mary Magdalene, and purchase land along the banks of the Jordan River.

=== Division after the Russian Revolution ===
In addition to the financial difficulties faced by the Mission in the post-World War I era it also had to deal with the divisions within Russian Orthodoxy that came about following the imprisonment of Patriarch St. Tikhon of Moscow and All Rus' by the Soviet government and his subsequent death. When it lost contact with the Moscow Patriarchate in 1920, the Mission's leadership submitted to the Synod Abroad organized for the Russian Orthodox Church Outside Russia by Metropolitan Anthony Khrapovitsky of Kiev.

The Synod Abroad sent Archbishop Anastasius Gribanovskiy, later the Russian Orthodox Church Outside Russia's second leader, to Jerusalem to help establish the Mission on firm legal grounds in the new situation caused by the unrest in the former Russian Empire and the founding of the Mandate.

The unity of the Mission under the Synod Abroad ended with the division of the British dominion between the State of Israel (established in 1948) and the Hashemite Kingdom of Jordan. Properties in Israel were appropriated by the pro-Soviet Israeli government and transferred to the Moscow Patriarchate, which established its own Mission administration under Archimandrite Leonid (Lobachev).

The original Mission's administration, headquartered in the Russian Compound that had been given to the Moscow Patriarchate, was transferred first to Gethsemane and then to the Mount of Olives. Despite the losses to the Moscow Patriarchate, the original Mission was able to purchase the site of the first great monastery in the Holy Land, St. Chariton's Monastery in Wadi Faran, and establish a skete there under the leadership of Archimandrite Demetrius. Fr. Demetrius together with Archbishop Alexander of Berlin led the Mission in the celebration of its 100th anniversary in 1958.

In early 1991 Alexy II of Moscow and All Rus' visited the Holy Land, stating during his pilgrimage that he came come "to pray first of all at the Lord's Golgotha on behalf of our Russian Golgotha, to visit the places of His grief and His glory, His death and His Resurrection." Patriarch Alexis was hosted by Diodore I of Jerusalem, who also maintained his church's communion with the Russian Orthodox Church Outside Russia despite its separation from the Moscow Patriarchate.

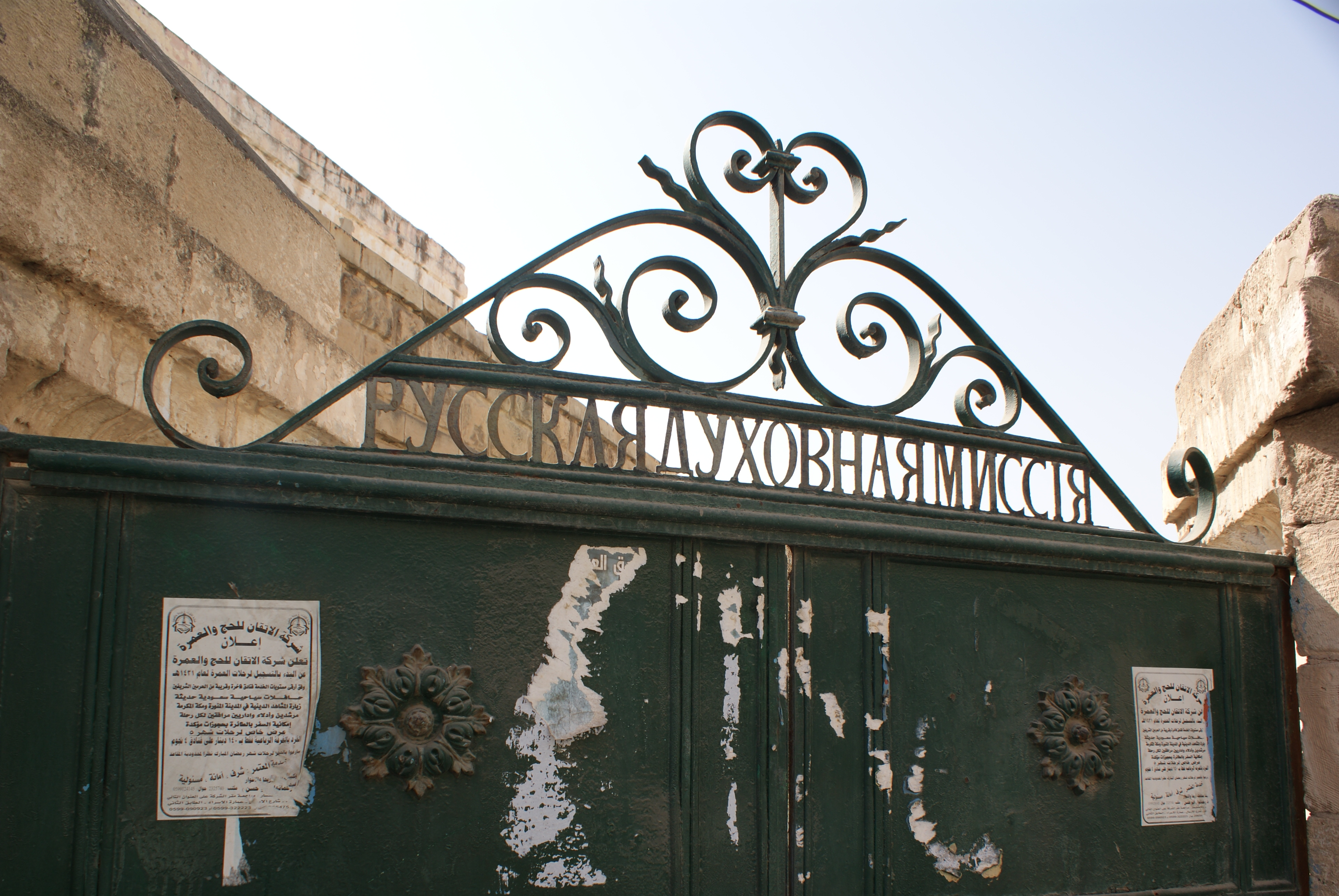
The Mission in Jericho

In the 1990s tensions between the two Missions flared when the Israeli government, acting under Russian pressure, transferred properties of the original Mission in Hebron and Jericho to the patriarchal Mission. The forcible expulsion of their monks and caretakers soured the already strained relations between the two Missions, which did not begin to recover until the reconciliation of the Moscow Patriarchate and the Russian Orthodox Church Outside Russia in 2007. (Today the Jericho properties are jointly administered by the two Missions.)

== Present day ==
As church life continues to recover in the former Soviet Union, growing numbers of pilgrims from Russia, Ukraine, and other former Soviet republics are flocking to the Holy Land. The two parts of the Russian Orthodox Ecclesiastical Mission share the work of caring for these pilgrims and administering the holy places under Russian Orthodox jurisdiction.

At the end of 2023, the patriarchal Mission Archimandrite Vassian (Zmeev) became the new head of the Russian Ecclesiastical Mission of the Moscow Patriarchate.

In 2025, the head of the ROCOR Mission is Hieromonk Roman (Krassovsky), formerly of Holy Trinity Monastery in Jordanville, New York. He joined the Mission in 2013.

Since the start of the 2023 conflict, the Mission has been living under attack, along with the rest of the region.

== Sites ==
- Russian Orthodox Convent of the Ascension, Jerusalem
- Russian Orthodox Church of the Ascension, Jerusalem

== See also ==
- Holy Land
- Greek Orthodox Church of Jerusalem
- Joasaph (McLellan)
- Moscow Patriarchate
- Russian Orthodox Church
- Russian Orthodox Church Outside Russia
- Tomb of the Prophets Haggai, Zechariah and Malachi
