= Mamre Institute =

Israeli research institute

The Mamre Institute (Hebrew: מכון ממרא) is an Israeli research institute whose aim is to provide accessible and accurate texts for the Hebrew Bible, Mishnah, Tosefta, Babylonian Talmud, Jerusalem Talmud, Mishneh Torah and Targum Onkelos.

The institute was named after the Book of Genesis' mention of Mamre. The Talmidey Chachamim who operate the institute are the disciples of Rabbi Yosef Kapach. The institute is located in the Givat Shaul neighborhood of West Jerusalem.
