= Oak of Mamre =

Venerated site in the West Bank

Coordinates: 31.5360035°N 35.0856543°E

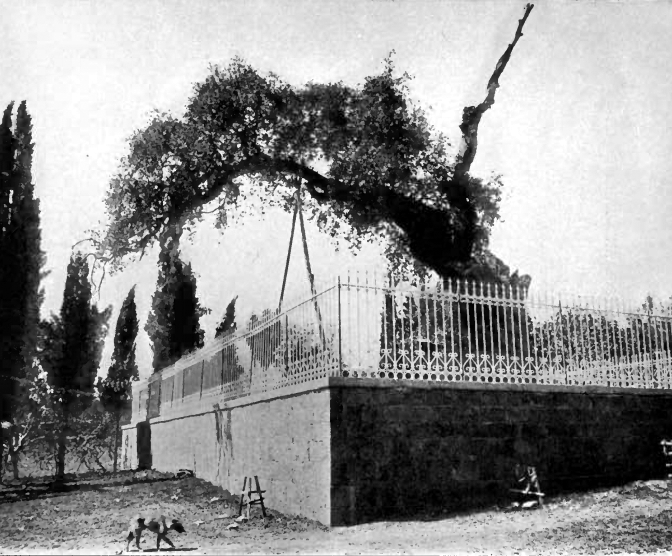
Abraham's Oak in 1912.

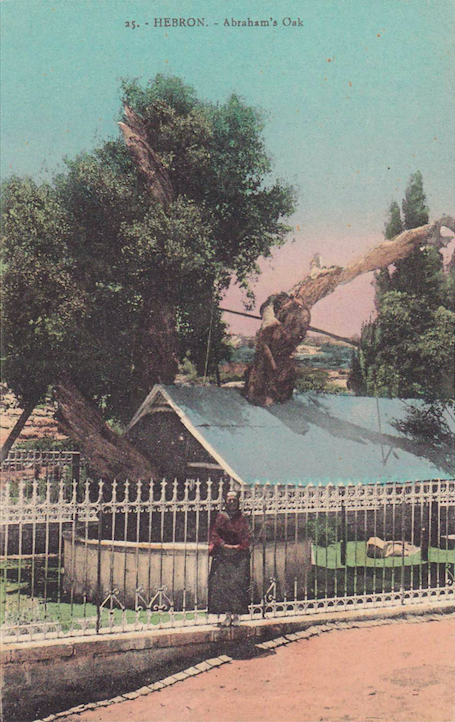
Coloured postcard of "Abraham's oak", by Karimeh Abbud, circa 1925

The Oak of Mamre (Ancient Greek: ἡ δρῦς τῆς Μαμβρῆ, romanized: hē drys tēs Mambrḗ) or Oak of Sibta at Khirbet es-Sibte or Ain Sibta in Hebron in the West Bank, is a site venerated by some as the "Oak of Abraham". It is distinct from the more ancient site of Mamre. It owes its name to an ancient tree, which seems to be dead but has a young sprig growing next to it, and stands on the grounds of the modern Russian Orthodox Church Outside of Russia's Church of the Holy Forefathers and Monastery of the Holy Trinity.

The old tree fell in 2019, but there are plans to preserve its trunk and sustain the growth of the young shoot.

The site is located two kilometres (1.2 miles) southwest of Mamre (Hebrew: מַמְרֵא), historically near Hebron ("And Abram moved his tent, and came to dwell at the terebinths of Mamre, which are in Hebron; and he built an altar there to יהוה") and now inside the city. Also called "The Oak of Abraham", it is an ancient oak tree (Quercus coccifera) which, in one tradition, is said to mark the place where Abraham entertained the three angels, or where Abraham pitched his tent.

== Different tradition until 1150s ==
This site is distinct and at a different location from the site considered as Mamre by Herod the Great, Josephus, Constantine the Great, early Church historians and Christian pilgrims all until the mid-12th century, such as Arculf and Abbot Daniel. That site is at a location called in Arabic Ramat al-Khalil (the older name used by archaeologists) and currently Bir al-Haram ar-Rameh, which is a few kilometres north of the site described in this article. After the mid-12th century, the traditional location of the Oak of Mamre migrated to different sites, the most prominent being the current location outside the church.

== History ==
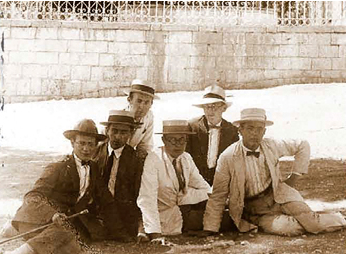
Students of the Hebron Yeshiva at the Oak of Mamre c. 1927.

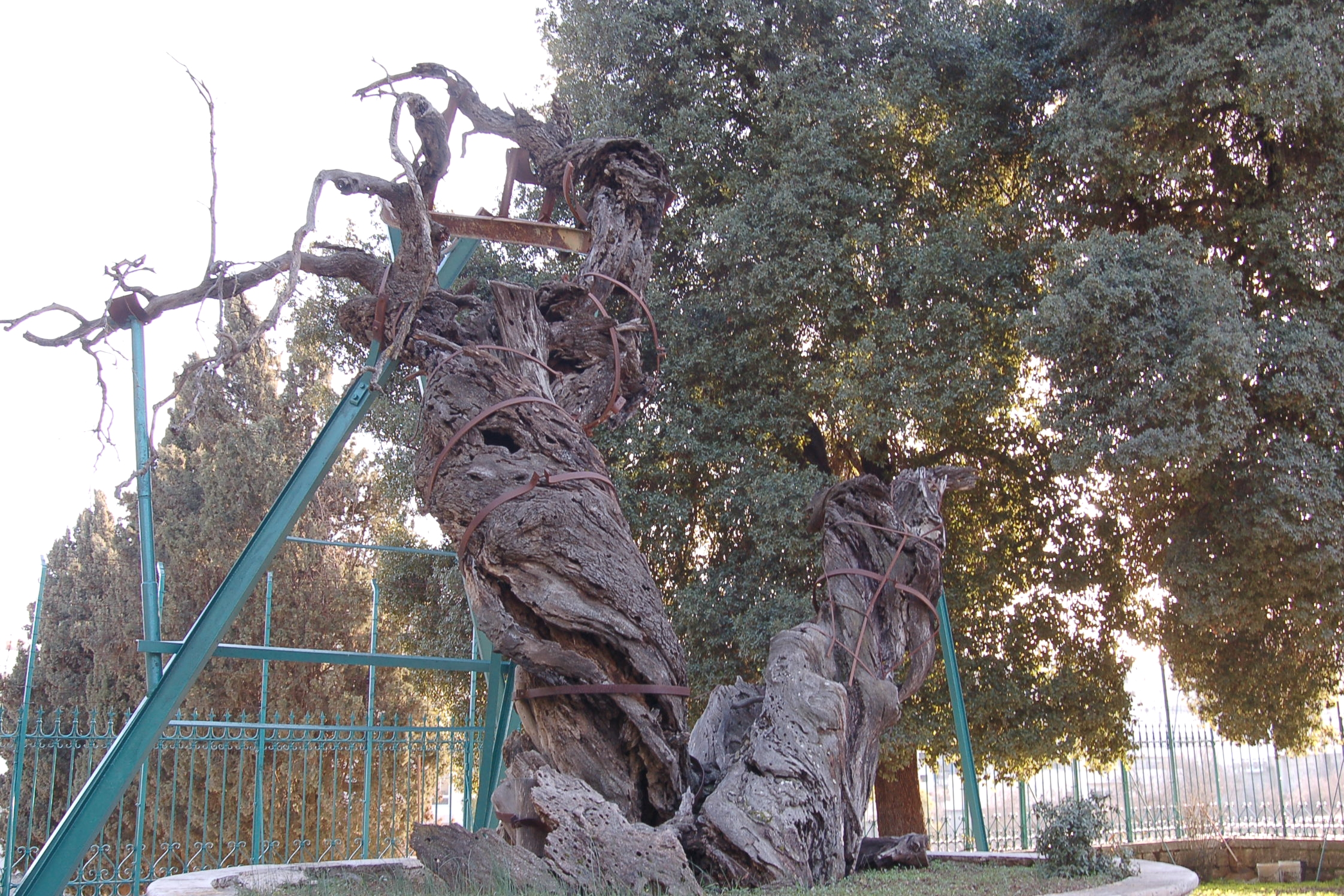
The Oak of Mamre in 2008, before collapsing in 2019

As written in a footnote from an 1895 publication of Arculf's pilgrimage report,

The Oak or Terebinth of Abraham has been shown in two different sites. Arculf and many others (Jerome, Itin[erarium] Hierosol[ymitanum], Sozomen, Eucherius [possibly Eucherius of Lyon], Benjamin of Tudela, the Abbot Daniel,.... etc.) seem to point to the ruin of er Râmeh, near which is Beit el Khulil, or Abraham's House, with a fine spring well. This is still held by the Jews to be the Oak of Mamre. The Christians point to another site, Ballûtet Sebta, where [there] is a fine specimen of Sindian (Quercus Pseudococcifera)."

Ballut is the Arabic word for oak.

The site of the oak was acquired in 1868 by Antonin Kapustin for the Russian Orthodox Church, and the Church of the Holy Forefathers and Monastery of the Holy Trinity was founded nearby. The site has since been a major attraction for Russian pilgrims before the revolution, and is the only functioning Christian shrine in the Hebron region. After the October Revolution, the property came under the control of the Russian Orthodox Church Outside of Russia.

A long-standing tradition is that the Oak of Abraham will die before the appearance of the Antichrist. The main oak trunk has appeared to be dead since 1996. Following construction work in the 1970s, a wooden ring in the form of a chalice was built around the tree, and its roots began to die. In 1997, a small sprig was seen growing near the withered oak. In October 2016, Russian botanists began a project to save the tree. In 1998 a root sprout appeared.

The Hebron Monastery has emerged as a political issue between Russia and Palestinian authorities.

== See also ==
- List of individual trees
