= Malachi =

Traditional writer of the Book of Malachi

Prophet Malachi
- מַלְאָכִי
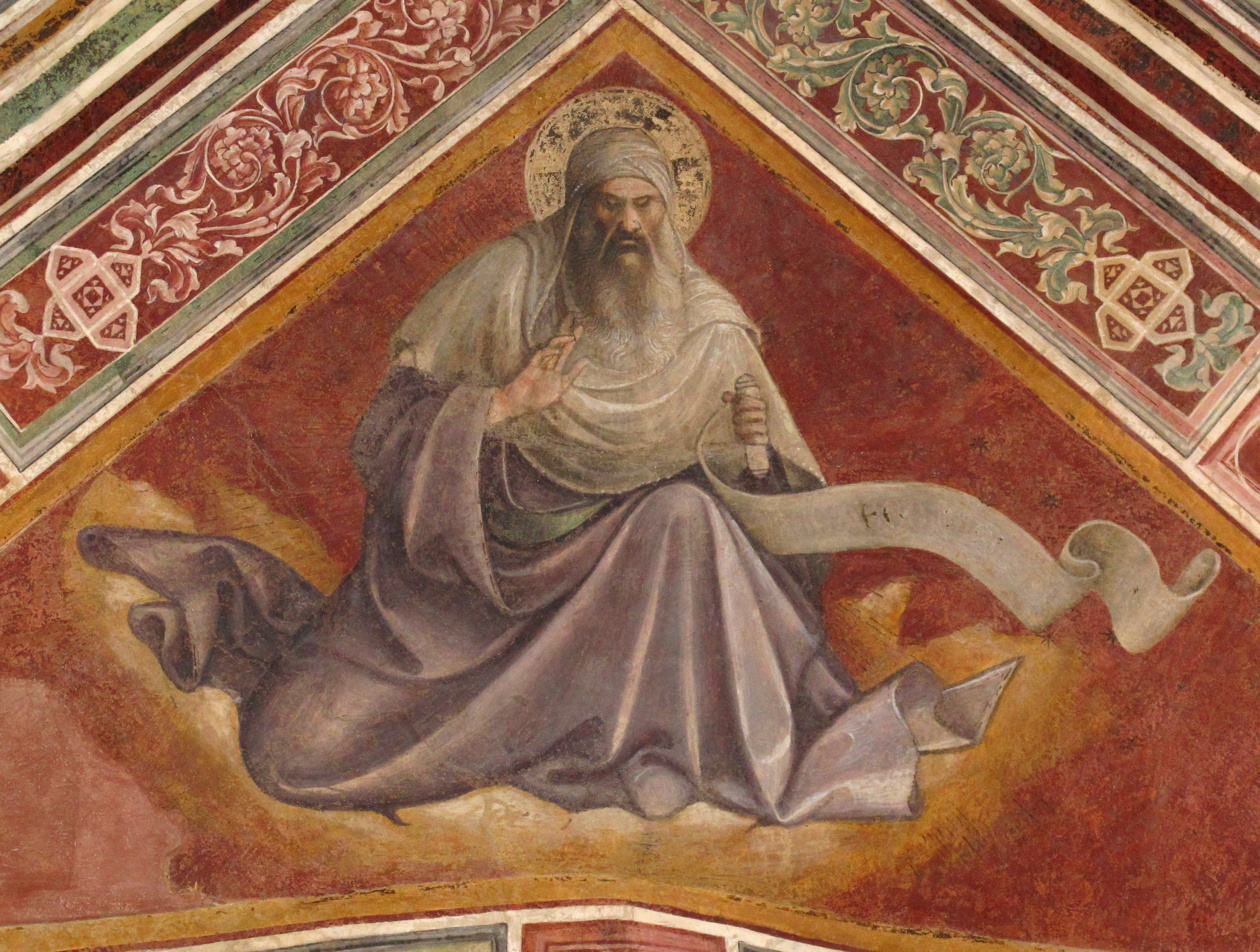
- Malachi depicted in the Bartolini Salimbeni Chapel, Florence
- Burial place: Tomb of the Prophets Haggai, Zechariah and Malachi, Jerusalem

Malachi or Malachias (/ˈmæləkaɪ/; Hebrew: מַלְאָכִי, Modern: Malʾaḵī, Tiberian: Malʾāḵī, 'my messenger') is the name used by the author of the Book of Malachi, the last book of the Nevi'im (Prophets) section of the Tanakh. It is possible that Malachi is not a proper name, because it means "messenger"; it has been assumed to be a pseudonym. According to Jewish tradition, Malachi's true identity is Ezra the scribe.

Some scholars argue that the Book of Malachi is the result of multiple stages of redaction; most of its text originated in the Persian period, with the oldest stratum from around 500 BCE and redactions into the Hellenistic period.

According to Jewish tradition, Malachi was the last of the prophets.

== Identity ==
The editors of the 1906 Jewish Encyclopedia implied that Malachi, also known as Malachias, prophesied after Haggai and Zechariah and speculated that he delivered his prophecies about 420 BC, after the second return of Nehemiah from Persia, or possibly before his return. The Talmud and the Aramaic Targum of Yonathan ben Uzziel identify Ezra as the same person as Malachi. This is the traditional view held by most Jews and some Christians, including Jerome. This identification is plausible, because "Malachi" reprimands the people for the same things Ezra did, such as marrying foreign pagan women. Malachi also focuses extensively on corrupt priests who Ezra, a priest himself who exhorted the people to follow the law, despised. According to Josephus, Ezra died and was buried "in a magnificent manner in Jerusalem". If the tradition that Ezra wrote under the name "Malachi" is correct, then Josephus meant that he was buried in the Tomb of the Prophets, the traditional resting place of Malachi. This would also explain why Ezra does not refer to a prophet named Malachi, while he did refer to other prophets such as Haggai and Zechariah.

Other potential identities includes Zerubbabel and Nehemiah; others suggest that Malachi was a separate person altogether, possibly a Levite and a member of the Great Assembly.

== Name ==
Because the name Malachi does not occur elsewhere in the Hebrew Bible, some scholars doubt whether it is intended to be the personal name of the prophet. The form mal'akhi (literally "my malakh") signifies "my messenger"; it occurs in Malachi 3:1 (compare to Malachi 2:7, but this form would hardly be appropriate as a proper name without some additional syllable such as Yah, whence mal'akhiah, i.e. "messenger of Yah". In the Book of Haggai, Haggai is designated the "messenger of the LORD." The non-canonical superscriptions prefixed to the book, in both the Septuagint and the Vulgate, warrant the supposition that Malachi's full name ended with the syllable -yah. The Septuagint translates the last clause of Malachi 1:1, "by the hand of his messenger", and the Targum reads, "by the hand of my angel, whose name is called Ezra the scribe". G.G. Cameron suggests that the termination of the word "Malachi" is adjectival, and equivalent to the Latin angelicus, signifying "one charged with a message or mission" (a missionary).

== Date ==
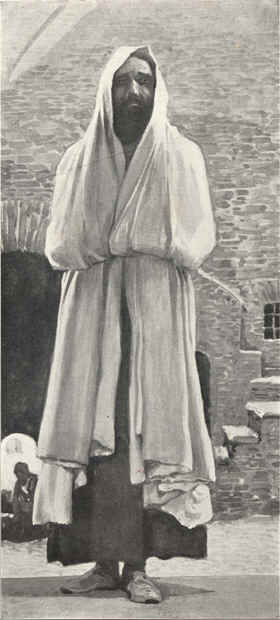
Imaginative image of Malachi (watercolor c. 1896–1902 by James Tissot)

Opinions vary as to the prophet's exact date, but nearly all scholars agree that Malachi prophesied during the Persian period, and after the reconstruction and dedication of the Second Temple in 516 BC. More specifically, Malachi probably lived and labored during the times of Ezra and Nehemiah. The abuses which Malachi mentions in his writings correspond so exactly with those which Nehemiah found on his second visit to Jerusalem in 432 BC that it seems reasonably certain that he prophesied concurrently with Nehemiah or shortly after. Bergstein suggests that he died in 312 BC.

== Message ==
According to biblical scholar W. Gunther Plaut:

Malachi describes a priesthood that is forgetful of its duties, a Temple that is underfunded because the people have lost interest in it, and a society in which Jewish men divorce their Jewish wives to marry out of the faith.

== Sources ==
- Van Hoonacker, Albin (1913). "Malachias". In Herbermann, Charles G. (ed.). The Catholic Encyclopedia. Vol. 9 (Special ed.). New York: Robert Appleton Company. pp. 563–565. OCLC 1293868540.
