= Tomb of the Prophets =

Ancient burial site in Jerusalem

- قبور الأنبياء (Arabic)
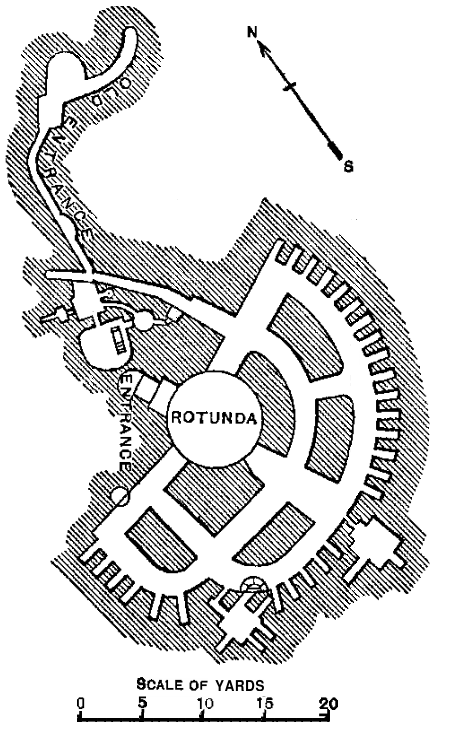
- Plan of the tomb
- Interactive map of Tomb of the Prophets
- 31°46′35″N 35°14′35″E
- Type: burial chamber
- Location: Mount of Olives, East Jerusalem
- Part of: Mount of Olives

History
- Built: 1st century CE

Site notes
- Excavation dates: 1870–1874
- Archaeologists: Charles Simon Clermont-Ganneau
- Owner: Russian Orthodox Church Outside of Russia
- Public access: Scheduled access (on-site caretaker)

The Tomb of the Prophets Haggai, Zechariah and Malachi (Arabic: قبور الأنبياء, romanized: Qubūr al-ʾAnbiyyāʾ} lit. 'Graves (of) the Prophets'; Hebrew: מערת הנביאים "Cave of the Prophets") is an ancient burial site located on the upper western slope of the Mount of Olives, Jerusalem. According to a medieval Jewish tradition also adopted by Christians, the catacomb is believed to be the burial place of Haggai, Zechariah and Malachi, the last three Hebrew Bible prophets who are believed to have lived during the 6th–5th centuries BC. Archaeologists have dated the three earliest burial chambers to the first century BC, thus contradicting the tradition.

== Burial chamber ==
The chamber forms two concentric passages containing 38 burial niches. The entrance to the large rock-cut burial cave is on the western side, where a staircase descends, flanked on both sides by a stone balustrade. It leads into a large circular central vault measuring 24 ft (7.3 m) in diameter. From it, two parallel tunnels, 5 ft (1.5 m) wide and 10 ft (3.0 m) high, stretch some 20 yd (18 m) through the rock. A third tunnel runs in another direction. They are all connected by cross galleries, the outer one of which measures 40 yd (37 m) in length.

Research shows that the complex actually dates from the 1st century BCE, when this style of tombs came into use for Jewish burial. Some Greek inscriptions discovered at the site suggest the cave was re-used to bury foreign Christians during the 4th and 5th centuries CE. On one of the side walls of the vault, a Greek inscription translates:

Put thy faith in God, Dometila: No human creature is immortal!

== Holy site ==
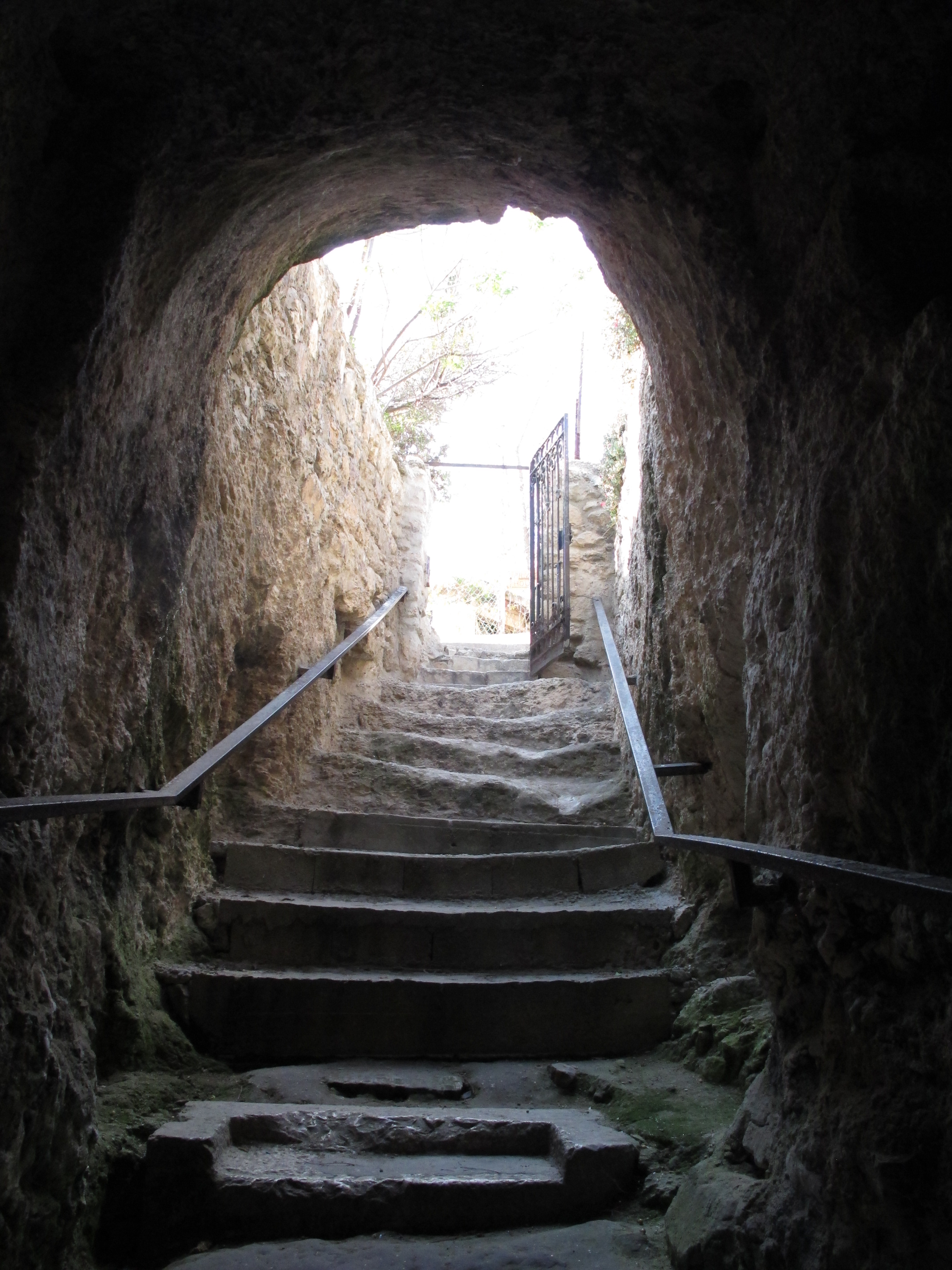
Entrance to the Tomb of the Prophets

The site has been venerated by the Jews since the Middle Ages, and they often visited the site. In 1882, Archimandrite Antonin Kapustin acquired the location for the Russian Orthodox Church. He planned to build a church at the site, which aroused strong protests by the Jews who visited and worshipped at the cave. The Ottoman courts ruled in 1890 that the transaction was binding but the Russians agreed not to display Christian symbols or icons at the site which was to remain accessible for people of all faiths.
