= Great Assembly =

Assembly of Jewish sages

According to Jewish tradition, the Great Assembly (Hebrew: כְּנֶסֶת הַגְּדוֹלָה, romanized: Kəneset haGədōlā, also translated as Great Synagogue or Synod) was an assembly of possibly 120 scribes, sages, and prophets, which existed from the early Second Temple period (around 516 BCE) to the early Hellenistic period (which began in the region with Alexander's conquest in 332 BCE), roughly coinciding with the Persian hegemony over the nation of Israel. The assembly's members, known as Anshei Knesset HaGedolah (אַנְשֵׁי כְּנֶסֶת הַגְּדוֹלָה, the "Men of the Great Assembly"), traditionally included such figures as Haggai, Zechariah, Malachi, Ezra, Nehemiah, Daniel, Hananiah, Mishael, Azariah, Mordechai and Zerubbabel.

Among the developments in Judaism that are attributed to the sages of this period are the fixing of the Jewish biblical canon (including the Book of Ezekiel, Daniel, Esther, and the Twelve Minor Prophets); the introduction of the Feast of Purim; and the institution of many prayers and rituals including the Amidah prayer.

== Membership ==
=== Role of prophets ===
The members of the Great Assembly are designated in the Mishnah as those who occupied a place in the chain of tradition between the Prophets and the tannaim:

The Prophets transmitted the Torah to the men of the Great Assembly. … Simon the Just was one of those who survived the Great Assembly, and Antigonus of Sokho received the Torah from him.

The first part of this statement is paraphrased as follows in Avot of Rabbi Natan:

Haggai, Zechariah, and Malachi received from the Prophets; and the men of the Great Assembly received from Haggai, Zechariah, and Malachi.

=== Number of members ===
According to R. Johanan (3rd century), the Amidah prayer was established by the "men of the Great Assembly". Similarly, R. Jeremiah (4th century) attributed the establishment of the Amidah to "120 elders, including about 80 prophets". These 120 elders are undoubtedly identical with the men of the Great Assembly. The number given of the prophets must, however, be corrected according to Megillah 17b, where the source of R. Jeremiah's statement is found: "R. Johanan said, and some say it was taught in a baraita, that 120 elders, including several prophets, instituted the Shemoneh Esreh." Thus, prophets formed a minority in the Great Assembly. According to the Babylonian Talmud, the date of Purim was fixed by the men of the Great Assembly, while the Jerusalem Talmud speaks of "85 elders, among them about 30 prophets" enacting the holiday. These divergent statements may be reconciled by reading in the one passage, "beside them" instead of "among them" in the Jerusalem Talmud; "30" instead of "80" prophets in R. Jeremiah's teaching.

The number 85 is taken from Nehemiah 10:2–29, but the origin of the entire number (120) is unknown. It was undoubtedly assumed that the company of those mentioned in Nehemiah 10 was increased to 120 by the prophets who took part in the sealing of the covenant, this view, which is confirmed by Nehemiah 7:7,14, being based on the hypothesis that other prophets besides Haggai, Zechariah, and Malachi were then preaching in Israel. These passages indicate that this assembly was believed to be the one described in Nehemiah 9–10, and other statements regarding it prove that the Amoraim accepted this identification as a matter of course. According to Yoel Bin Nun, a total of 120 names are recorded among those returning to Judea with Zerubbabel (Ezra 1–2), another 120 in Ezra 10, and another 120 in Nehemiah 11–12, suggesting that throughout this period some kind of forum with 120 members was used to represent the people.

== Time period ==
Numerous sources in rabbinic literature indicate that the Great Assembly existed in the generation of Ezra and Nehemiah. These include:

- Rabbi Joshua ben Levi derived the term "Great Assembly" from Ezra's choice of words in Nehemiah 9:32.
- Various sources specify Nehemiah 9:5, 9:6, 9:7, and 9:18 as being spoken by the Great Assembly, while in the Bible these verses refer to a ceremony led by Ezra.
- Nehemiah was considered to have been a member of the Great Assembly. Since Nehemiah himself was a member, Samuel b. Marta, a pupil of Rav, quoted a phrase used by Nehemiah in his prayer (1:7) as originating with his colleagues.
- Ezra was one of the members, and, according to Nehemiah 8, he was even regarded as the leader. In the midrash to Song of Songs 7:14, one version mentions Ezra and his companions ("Ezra vahaburato"), while the other version mentions "men of the Great Assembly".
- In the targum to Song of Songs, the leaders of the exiles (Ezra, etc.) are described as "men" or "sages" of the Great Assembly.
- In one textual version of Genesis Rabbah 71:3, the returning exiles mentioned in Ezra 2:51 are dubbed "the men of the Great Assembly".
- In Esther Rabbah 3:7, the congregation of the tribes mentioned in Judges 20:1 is apparently termed "men of the Great Assembly." This is due to a corruption of the text, according to Luria's emendation this phrase must be read with the preceding words "Ezra and the men of the Great Assembly"; so that the phrase corresponds to the "benei ha-golah" of Ezra 10:16.
- Zechariah lived in approximately 516 BCE a few decades before Ezra's flourishing.
- Ezra uttered the Tetragrammaton. Elsewhere, Abba bar Kahana states that "Two generations used the Tetragrammaton: the men of the Great Assembly and the generation of the shemad" (the persecution of Hadrian and the Bar Kochba revolt).

The last statement suggests that the Great Assembly lasted only for a single generation—the generation of Ezra. It appears from all these passages in traditional literature that the idea of the Great Assembly was based on the narrative in Nehemiah 8–10, and that its members were the leaders of Israel who had returned from exile and reestablished the Jewish community in Israel. According to the rabbinic chronology, the period of Persian rule lasted just 34 years, at the beginning of the period of the Second Temple, therefore Abba bar Kahana speaks of a single "generation of the men of the Great Assembly".

Modern chroniclers put the period of Persian rule at c. 190 years, spanning several generations (see Missing years (Jewish calendar)). As the last prophets were still active during this time, they also were included. Rabbinic chronology also held that prophecy ceased with the conquest of Alexander the Great. In view of these facts, it was natural that the Great Assembly should be regarded as the connecting-link in the chain of tradition between the Prophets and the sages. It may easily be seen, therefore, why Simeon the Just should be termed a survivor of the Great Assembly, for, according to rabbinic tradition, it was he who met Alexander.

The term "Great Assembly" (knesset hagedolah) primarily referred to the assembly of Nehemiah 9–10, which convened principally for religious purposes—fasting, reading of the Torah, confession of sins, and prayer. Since every gathering for religious purposes was called knesset, this term was applied also to the assembly in question; as it was an assembly of special importance it was designated more specifically as the "Great Assembly". For similar reasons, another important religious gathering in this period was known as the kehillah gedolah ("great gathering").

== Rulings ==
In addition to fixing the ritual observances for the first two quarters of the day, the Great Assembly engaged in legislative proceedings, making laws as summarized in the Book of Nehemiah.

As certain institutions assumed to have been established in the early Second Temple period were ascribed to Ezra, so others of them were ascribed to the "men of the Great Assembly". There is no difference between the two classes of institutions so far as origin is concerned. In some cases Ezra (the great scribe and the leader of the Great Assembly) is mentioned as the author, in others the entire Great Assembly mentioned; in all cases the Assembly with Ezra at its head must be thought of as the real authors. In traditional literature, however, a distinction was generally drawn between the institutions of Ezra and those of the men of the Great Assembly, so that they figured separately. But it is not surprising, after what has been said above, that in the Tanhuma the "Tikkunei Soferim" (called also "Tikkunei Ezra") should be ascribed to the men of the Great Assembly, since the author of the passage in question identified the Soferim (i.e., Ezra and his successors) with them.

The following rulings were ascribed to the men of the Great Assembly:

- They included the books of Ezekiel, Daniel, Esther, and the Twelve Minor Prophets in the Biblical canon; this is the only possible explanation of the baraita that they "wrote" those books. Ezekiel, Daniel and Esther—which were composed outside Israel—had to be accepted by the Great Assembly in order to merit inclusion. The grouping of the Minor Prophets was completed by the works of the three post-exilic prophets, who were themselves members of the Great Assembly. In this source, Ezra and Nehemiah (who were members of the Great Assembly) are mentioned as the last biblical writers (of the books named after them as well as Chronicles); while according to II Maccabees Nehemiah also collected a number of the books of the Bible.
- According to one opinion, they introduced the triple classification of the oral law into the branches of midrash, halakhot, and aggadot. This view is noteworthy as showing that the later representatives of tradition traced the origin of their science to the earliest authorities, the immediate successors of the Prophets. The men of the Great Assembly, therefore, not only completed the canon, but introduced the scientific treatment of tradition.
- They introduced the Feast of Purim and determined the days on which it should be celebrated.
- They instituted the Shemoneh Esreh, the blessings, and the various forms of kedushah and havdalah prayers. This tradition expresses the view that the synagogal prayers as well as the entire ritual were put into definite shape by the men of the Great Assembly.

=== Other activity ===
- According to Rav, the list of biblical personages who have no share in the World to Come was made by the men of the Great Assembly.
- An aggadic ruling on biblical stories beginning with the phrase "Va-yehi bayamim" (And it came to pass in those days) is designated by Johanan bar Nappaha, or his pupil Levi II, as a "tradition of the men of the Great Assembly". This is merely another way of saying, as is stated elsewhere in reference to the same ruling, that it had been brought as a tradition from the Babylonian exile. There are references also to other aggadic traditions of this kind.
- Joshua ben Levi ascribes in an original way to the men of the Great Assembly the merit of having provided for all time for the making of copies of the Bible, tefillin, and mezuzot, stating that they instituted twenty-four fasts to ensure that wealth would not be acquired by copyists, who would cease to copy if they became rich.
- The Mishnah ascribes the following teaching to the men of the Great Assembly: "Be patient in judgment; have many pupils; put a fence about the Torah." This aphorism, ascribed to an entire body of men, can only be interpreted as expressing their spirit and tendency, yet it must have been formulated by some individual, probably one of them. Like most of the first chapter of Avot, this passage is addressed to the teachers and spiritual leaders rather than to the people. These principles show commonalities with the spirit of Ezra's teaching on one hand, and with the later judicial philosophy of the Pharisees on the other hand.

According to Sherira Gaon, the extensive traditions of the Oral Torah (first recorded in the Mishnah) were known by the Great Assembly, but transmitted orally from generation to generation, until eventually being recorded in the names of later sages.

== Modern scholarship ==
Modern scholars have given a variety of views regarding the nature of the Great Assembly. These can be divided into four categories:

- The Great Assembly did not exist as a distinct institution, contrary to the rabbinic traditions.
- The Great Assembly was the official government in Jerusalem, led by the high priest.
- The Great Assembly was the term for assemblies of Jewish leaders who would occasionally meet in times of crisis to decide on pressing issues.
- The Great Assembly was the governing body of an unofficial religious movement, composed of the Pharisees.

Some modern scholars suggest that rather than describing a specific institution, the term "Great Assembly" is a reference to a specific time period (between the return from Babylonian captivity and the Macedonian conquest). Louis Jacobs, while not endorsing this view, remarks that "references in the [later] Rabbinic literature to the Men of the Great Synagogue can be taken to mean that ideas, rules, and prayers, seen to be pre-Rabbinic but post-biblical, were often fathered upon them".

A minority position says that the Great Assembly was also the assembly described in I Maccabees 14:25–26, which made Simeon the Hasmonean a hereditary prince (18th of Elul, 140 BC).

== See also ==
- Council of Jamnia
- Sanhedrin
