= Holy Trinity Cathedral, Jerusalem =

Russian Orthodox church in the Russian compound in Jerusalem

Holy Trinity Cathedral
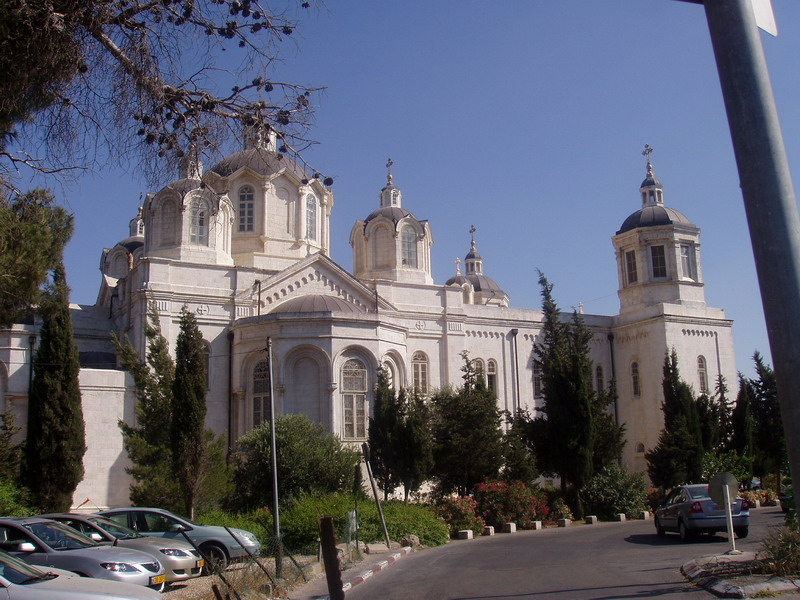

Religion
- Affiliation: Russian Orthodox Church
- Year consecrated: 1872

Location
- Location: Jerusalem
- Interactive map of Holy Trinity Cathedral
- Coordinates: 31.78159°N 35.223005°E

Architecture
- Architect: Martin Eppinger
- Style: Byzantine Revival
- Completed: 1872

The Holy Trinity Cathedral (Russian: Свято-Троицкий собор, Hebrew: קתדרלת השילוש הקדוש) is a cathedral of the Russian Orthodox Church, located at the heart of the so-called Russian Compound in central Jerusalem. The cathedral was built in 1860–1872 by a Russian Orthodox Ecclesiastical Mission in Jerusalem, when the Holy City was part of the Ottoman Empire.

== Layout ==
The Martin Eppinger designed the church as a cruciform building, a basilica with one central nave and two side aisles, and two lateral rooms in the shape of rounded apses completing the cross-shaped layout. The cathedral is built from white stone, with eight steeples, each topped by a cross. The inside of the cathedral is covered with murals and barely contains chairs. Most of the worshippers are praying to stand, as is customary in Orthodox churches.

== History ==
The Cathedral of the Holy Trinity was officially founded on 11 September 1860. In 1864 the outside was completed, but the construction was suspended due to budgetary issues. By 1872 the cathedral was luxuriously inaugurated, in a ceremony where Duke Nicholas participated. Since then the cathedral has been used by pilgrims and locals.

The author of the project was German-Russian architect, Martin Eppinger. It was originally supposed to be consecrated as the church of St. Alexander Nevsky (the patron saint of Alexander II), but finally it was decided to dedicate it as the Cathedral of the Holy Trinity.

In 1895 to 1897, the cathedral was renovated. The process included repairing the roof and fixing the blind area. Further, the glutinous paints on the walls of the cathedral were scraped off, with three interiors painted white. Then the cathedral was decorated with sacred images. Next to the altar an emergency exit was built.

In the period of the British Mandate, the Trinity Cathedral remained independent. It was under the jurisdiction of the Russian Orthodox Church Outside of Russia.

During the first Arab-Israeli war the church was badly damaged. From 1948 it has been under the jurisdiction of the Moscow Patriarchate of the Russian Orthodox Church. The ownership of the church is undetermined as it is part of an ongoing legal and diplomatic controversy between Russia and Israel apparently centered on the arrest of an Israeli citizen for drug smuggling.

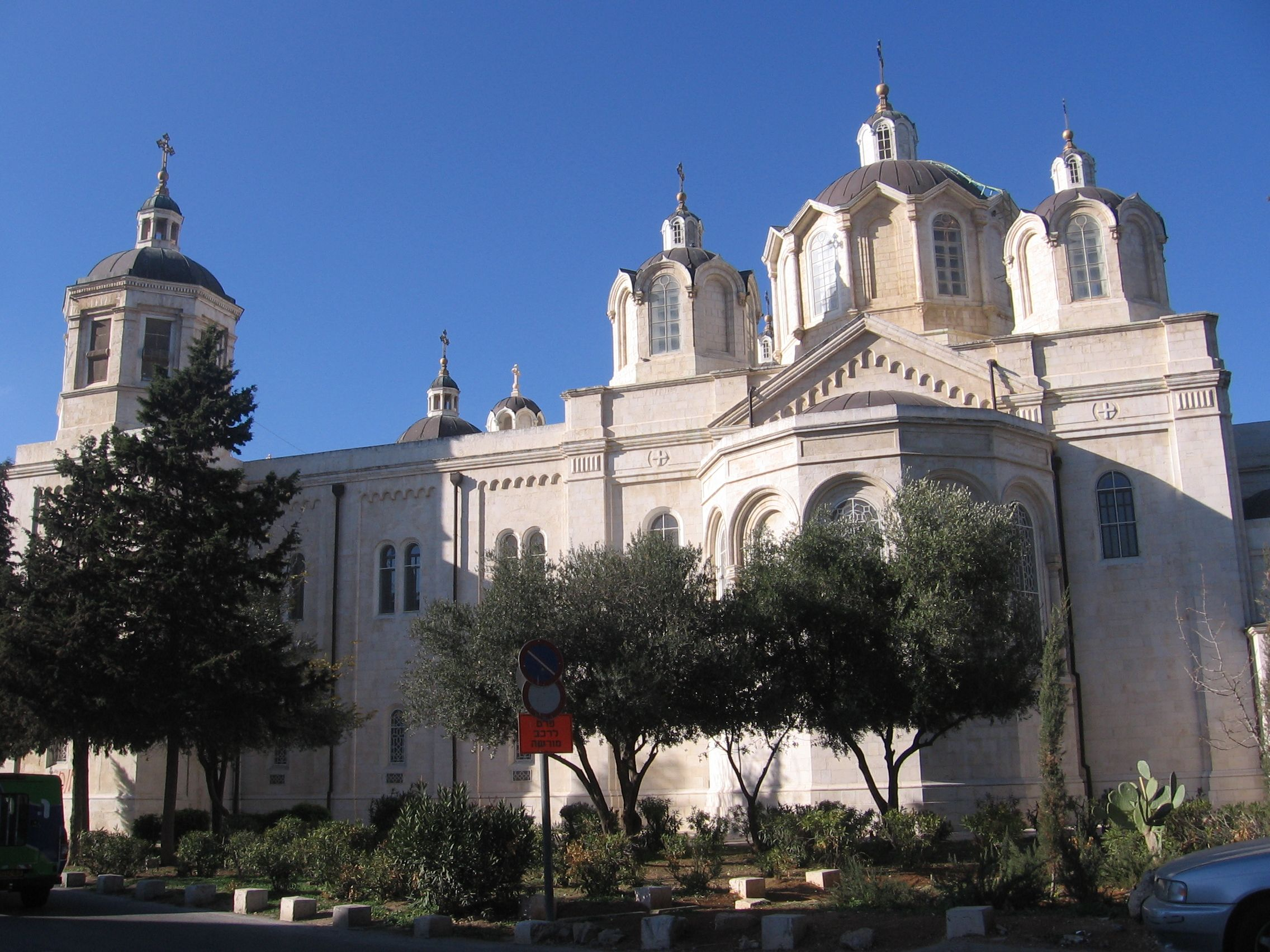
The outside of the cathedral

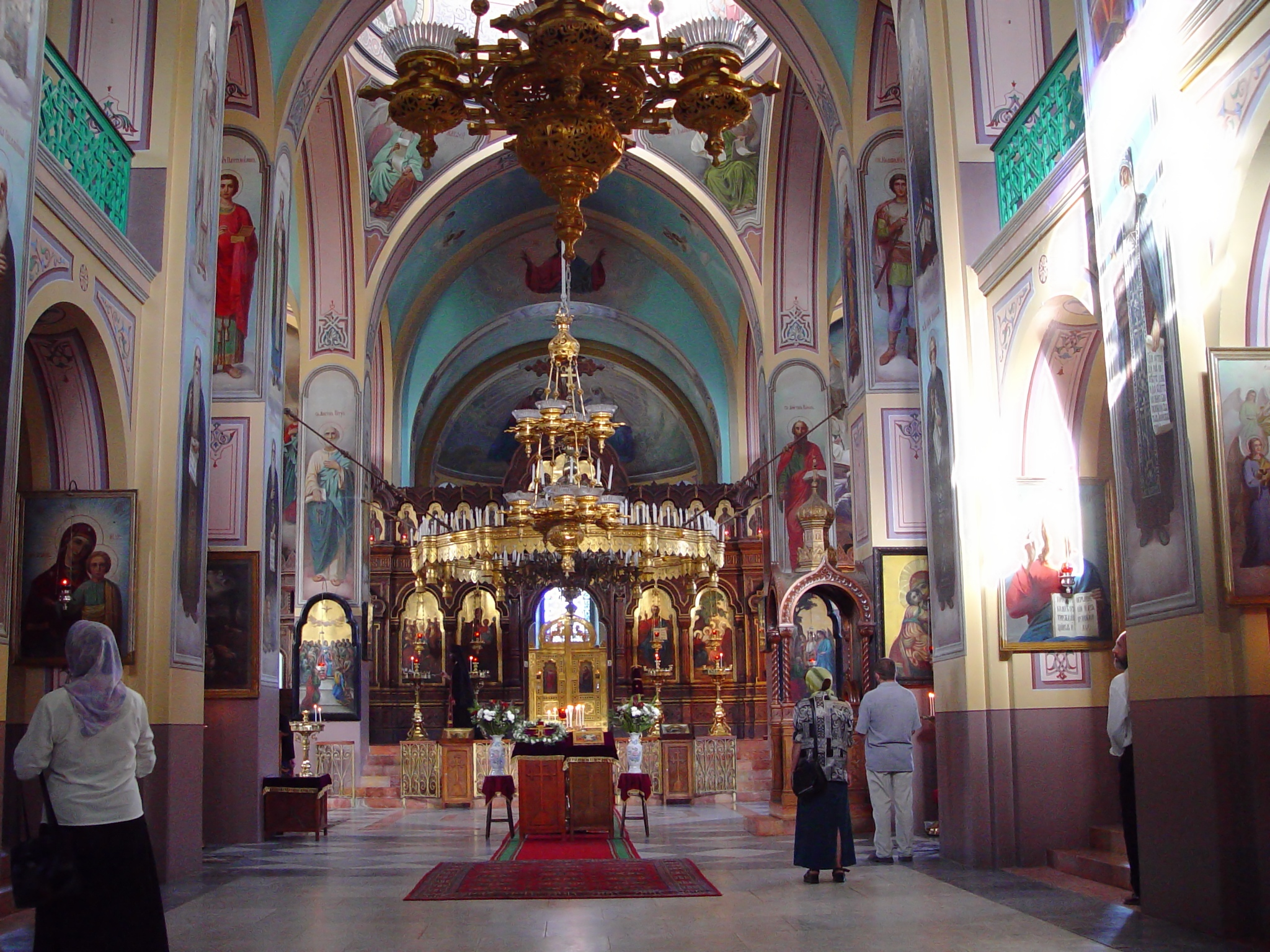
The inside of the cathedral

== See also ==
- Russian Orthodox Ecclesiastical Mission in Jerusalem
- Russian Orthodox Church in Israel
- Russian Orthodox properties in the State of Palestine
- Church of Mary Magdalene
