= Haggai =

Hebrew prophet

Prophet Haggai חַגַּי
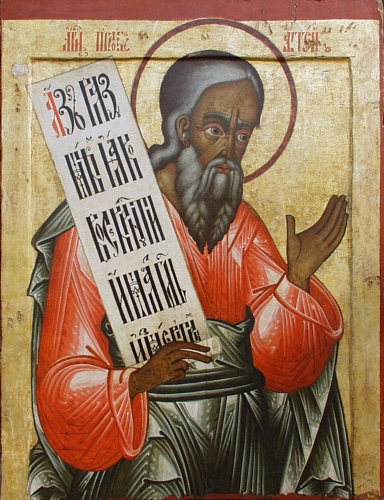
- Russian icon of Haggai, 18th century (Iconostasis of Kizhi monastery, Karelia, Russia)

Saint
- Died: 5th Century BC; Jerusalem, Judaea
- Resting place: Tomb of the Prophets, Mount of Olives, Jerusalem
- Honored in: Christianity; Judaism; Islam; Rastafari
- Major shrine: Tomb of the Prophets, Mount of Olives, Jerusalem
- Feast: 16 December (Orthodox, Catholic), 31 July (Armenian), 20 Koiak (Oriental Orthodox)

Haggai or Aggeus (/ˈhæɡaɪ/; Hebrew: חַגַּי – Ḥaggay; lit. 'One who celebrates'; Koine Greek: Ἀγγαῖος; Latin: Aggaeus) was a Hebrew prophet active during the building of the Second Temple in Jerusalem, one of the twelve minor prophets in the Hebrew Bible, and the author or subject of the Book of Haggai. He is known for his prophecy in 520 BC, commanding the Jews to rebuild the Temple. He was the first of three post-exilic prophets from the Neo-Babylonian Exile of the House of Judah (with Zechariah, his contemporary, and Malachi, who lived about one hundred years later), who belonged to the period of Jewish history which began after the return from captivity in Babylon. His name means "my holidays".

== Life ==
Scarcely anything is known of his personal history, with the book of Haggai offering no biographical details about his ancestry or anything else in his life outside the prophecies of 520 BCE. Haggai is only mentioned in one other book of the Bible, the book of Ezra. He may have been one of the captives taken to Babylon by Nebuchadnezzar. Some commenters suggest he may have been an old man, and seen the previous temple before its destruction due to what he says about the former glory of the Temple in Haggai 2:3. Other sources suggest that he was born in Babylon. He began God's prophecy about sixteen years after the return of the Jews to Judah (ca. c. 520 BC). The work of rebuilding the temple had been put to a stop through the intrigues of the Samaritans. After having been suspended for eighteen years, the work was resumed through the efforts of Haggai and Zechariah. They exhorted the people, which roused them from their lethargy, and induced them to take advantage of a change in the policy of the Persian government under Darius I.

== Haggai prophecies ==
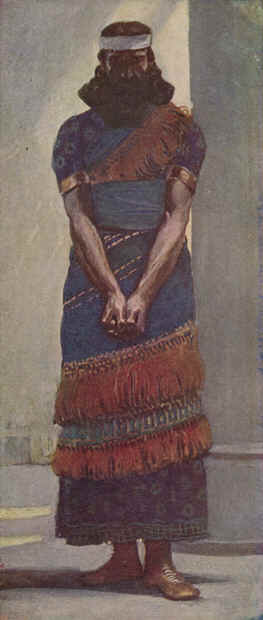
Haggai (watercolor circa 1896–1902 by James Tissot)

Haggai prophesied in late 520 BC Jerusalem, about the people needing to complete building the Temple. He has four messages, which begin on August 29 and culminate on December 18. The new Temple was bound to exceed the awesomeness of the previous Temple. He claimed if the Temple was not built there would be poverty, famine and drought affecting the Jewish nation.

There is a controversy regarding who edited Haggai's works. According to scholars, they credit it to his students. However, Jewish traditions state that the Men of the Great Assembly were responsible for the edits. The Men of the Great Assembly are traditionally known for continuing the work of Ezra and Nehemiah.

== Haggai and officials of his time ==
Haggai supported the officials of his time, specifically Zerubbabel, the governor of Judah, and Joshua the High Priest. In the Book of Haggai, God refers to Zerubbabel as "my servant" as King David was, and says he will make him as a "signet ring", as King Jehoiachin was. The signet ring symbolized a ring worn on the hand of Yahweh, showing that a king held divine favour. Thus, Haggai is implicitly, but not explicitly, saying that Zerubbabel would preside over a restored Davidic kingdom.

== Jewish Persian diplomacy ==
The Persian Empire was growing weak, and Haggai saw time as an opportunity to restore the Davidic Kingdom. He believed that the Kingdom of David was able to rise and take back their part in Jewish issues. Haggai's message was directed to the nobles and Zerubbabel, as he would be the first Davidic monarch restored. He saw this as important because the Kingdom would be an end to Jewish idol worship.

== Haggai in Jewish tradition ==
Haggai, in rabbinic writing, is often referred to as one of the men of the Great Assembly. The Babylonian Talmud (5th century CE) mentions a tradition concerning the prophet Haggai, saying that he gave instruction concerning three things: (a) that it is not lawful for a man whose brother married his daughter (as a co-wife in a polygamous relationship) to consummate a levirate marriage with one of his deceased brother's co-wives (a teaching accepted by the School of Hillel, but rejected by the School of Shammai); (b) that Jews living in the regions of Ammon and Moab separate from their produce the poor man's tithe during the Sabbatical year; (c) that they accept of proselytes from the peoples of Tadmor (Palmyra) and from the people of Ḳardu.

== Liturgical commemoration ==
On the Eastern Orthodox liturgical calendar, Haggai is commemorated as a saint and prophet. His feast day is 16 December (for those churches which follow the traditional Julian Calendar, 16 December currently falls on 29 December of the modern Gregorian Calendar), this is the same for Roman and Melkite Catholics. In the Coptic calendar used by the Oriental Orthodox Churches his feast day falls on 20 Koiak. He is also commemorated, in common with the other righteous persons of the Old Testament, on the Sunday of the Holy Fathers (the second Sunday before the Nativity of the Lord).

Haggai is commemorated with the other Minor prophets in the calendar of saints of the Armenian Apostolic Church on 31 July.

== Haggai in Freemasonry ==
In the Masonic degree of Holy Royal Arch Haggai is one of the Three Principals of the Chapter. Named after Haggai the prophet and accompanies Zerubbabel, Prince of the People, and Joshua, the son of Josedech, the High Priest.

== See also ==
- Book of Haggai
- Tomb of the Prophets Haggai, Zechariah and Malachi
