= Porphyrius Uspensky =

Russian, bishop, traveller and scholar (1804–1885)

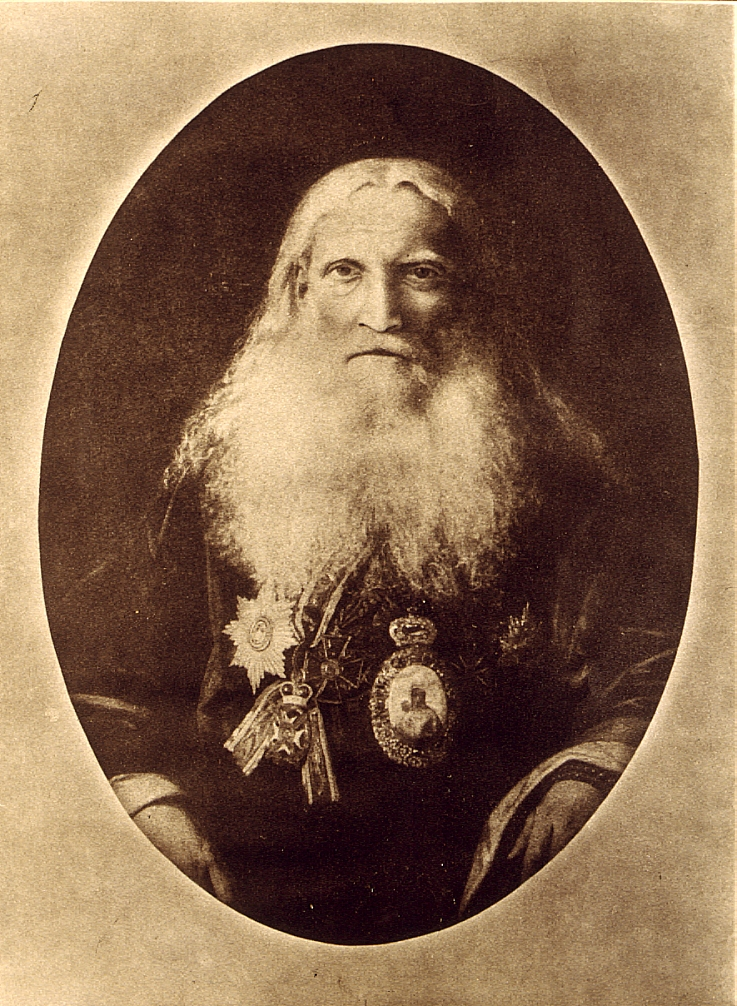
Uspensky, 1880s.

Bishop Porphyrius (Russian: Епи́скоп Порфи́рий; secular name: Konstantin Aleksandrovich Uspensky; Russian: Константи́н Алекса́ндрович Успе́нский; 8 September 1804 – 19 April 1885) was a Russian traveller, theologian, orientalist, archaeologist and byzantinologist, founder of the Russian Ecclesiastical Mission in Jerusalem, and discoverer of several ancient codices. From 1865 on, he was auxiliary bishop of Chigirin.

== Life ==
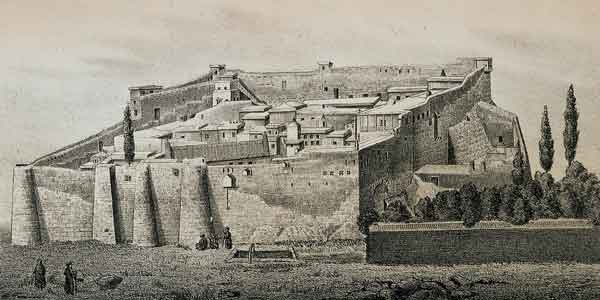
Lithograph of Saint Catherine's Monastery, based on sketches made by Uspensky in 1857.

Konstantin Uspensky was born on 8 September 1804 in Kostroma, Russian Empire. He finished religious school in 1818 and four years after, he finished his studies at the Theological Seminary in Kostroma. In 1829, he finished studies at Saint Petersburg Theological Academy. That same year, he became a priest and received the name of Porphyrius.

In 1834, he became an archimandrite in Odessa. While in Odessa, he became interested in Oriental Orthodoxy, learned Modern Greek and Italian. He travelled to Palestine in 1842 and became head of the newly established Russian Orthodox Ecclesiastical Mission in Jerusalem in 1847, which he headed until 1854. In 1845 and 1846, he travelled to Mount Athos in Greece and Mount Sinai in Egypt. He saw the Codex Sinaiticus in Saint Catherine's Monastery in 1844 (one year after Constantin von Tischendorf's first visit). After a visit to the monastery of Mar Saba, he took a codex, which was later named after him (the Uspenski Gospels), and he brought it together with other manuscripts such as the Codex Porphyrianus to Russia. Four pre-Iconoclast encaustic icons brought by Uspensky from Sinai are still preserved in Kyiv, Ukraine.

In 1869, he received a doctoral degree in Greek philosophy. Uspensky died on 19 April 1885 and was buried in the Novospassky Monastery in Moscow.

== Works ==
- Путешествие по Египту и в монастыри Святого Антония Великого и Преподобного Павла Фивейского, в 1850 году. Petersburg, 1856.
- Путешествие по Египту и в монастыри Святого Антония Великого и Преподобного Павла Фивейского, в 1850 году. СПб., 1856.
- 'Christian East: Egypt and Sinai' (Восток христианский: Египет и Синай), Petersburg, 1857.
- Мнение о синайской Библии (полемика с Тишендорфом, 1862). (About Codex Sinaiticus, polemic with Tischendorf).
- "Восток христианский. Абиссиния", in: "Труды Киевской Академии", 1866.
- 'History of Athos' (История Афона), Two volumes, 1871.
- Второе путешествие в афонские монастыри, (Москва, 1880).
- Дионисий Ареопагит и его творения, в: "Чтения Московского Общества Любителей Духовного Просвещения", 1885.

== Bibliography ==
- Порфирий Успенский, Первое путешествие в Синайский монастырь в 1845 году, Petersburg 1856.
- А. Дмитриевский, Еп. Порфирий Успенский, как инициатор и организатор первой рус. дух. миссии в Иерусалиме, Petersburg, 1906.
- А. Дмитриевский, Порфирий (Успенский) по поводу 100-летия со дня его рождения, Petersburg, 1906.
- П. Сырку, Описание бумаг еп. Порфирия (Успенского), пожертвованных имп. акад. наук по завещанию, Petersburg, 1891.
