= Antonin Kapustin =

Russian Orthodox monk (1817–1894)

Antonin
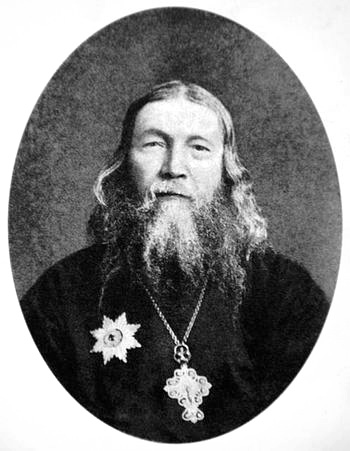
- Church: Russian Orthodox Church
- See: Russian Orthodox Ecclesiastical Mission in Jerusalem
- Appointed: 1853
- Term ended: 5 April 1894
- Predecessor: Leonid Kavelin
- Successor: Raphael Trukhin

Personal details
- Born: Andrey Ivanovich Kapustin; 24 August 1817 Baturino, Russian Empire (now Kurgan Oblast, Russia)
- Died: 5 April 1894 (aged 76) Jaffa, Ottoman Empire (now part of Tel Aviv, Israel)
- Education: Kiev Theological Academy

Archimandrite Antonin (Russian: Архимандри́т Антони́н, romanized: Arkhimandrit Antonin; 24 August [O.S. 12 August] 1817 – 5 April [O.S. 24 March] 1894), born Andrey Ivanovich Kapustin (Russian: Андре́й Ива́нович Капу́стин) was a Russian Orthodox monk. He was a noted Byzantologist and honorary member of many academies and scientific societies. He is noted for his activities in Greece and the Holy Land establishing ecclesiastical facilities and support for Russian pilgrims.

== Life ==
Andrey Kapustin was born on 12 August 1817 in the village of Baturino, in a priestly family. He attended the Kiev Theological Academy, where he taught after his graduation. Entering monasticism, he was tonsured as monk with the name Antonin and rose to the rank of archimandrite.

A theologian and professor at the Kiev Theological Academy, in 1847, Fr. Antonin was assigned to the Church of the Savior, a church in disrepair in Athens, Greece that had been purchased by the Russian government of Tsar Alexander II to serve the Russian community in Athens. He led the effort to restore the church. During his service in Athens he also supervised archaeological excavations under the church that revealed the ruins of an earlier church and an even older Roman bath.

In 1860, Antonin served as the priest of the Russian embassy church in Constantinople where he was introduced into a new circle of acquaintances with influential Russians and Greeks in the Near East.

In 1865, Antonin joined, as chief, the Russian Orthodox Ecclesiastical Mission in Jerusalem, a mission that had been officially established and recognized by the Ottoman Sultan in 1857. During Antonin's administration of the mission, he worked intently to strengthen the mission and its responsibilities to help Russian pilgrims to Jerusalem. In accomplishing the task, he began a vigorous activity of land acquisitions in Palestine and established hospices. These acquisitions were also inspired as a means of resisting the activities by Protestants and Roman Catholics who were active acquiring land and buildings in Palestine.

In November 1868, Antonin made his first acquisition, that of the Oak of Mamre, that according to the Scriptures was where the Old Testament Patriarch Abraham provided hospitality to three angels. In 1874, he had built near the Oak a hostel for the pilgrims.

Archimandrite Antonin, with Igumen Parthenius, acquired land at the summit of the Mount of Olives on which, in 1870, they built the Church of the Ascension with a 200-foot bell tower. Later, after Antonin's repose, Igumen Parthenius established the Convent of the Ascension at the site.

In 1871, Antonin acquired an extensive olive tree plantation upon which were two buildings that were used to shelter Russian pilgrims. The property was expanded with the purchase of adjacent lands. On this land, Antonin directed that pilgrims who wished to settle in Jerusalem had to build houses and plant the gardens around them at their own expense. That is why there are no blocks of cells for monastics when Russian nuns formed a separate convent, the Gorneye Convent, and began living there. The Church of the Meeting of the Most Holy Virgin Mary with St. Elizabeth was consecrated on 30 March 1883 at the convent. This consecration led to the addition of this feast to the Orthodox Liturgical calendar with the composition of the service added to the Menaion by Archimandrite Antonin.

In 1882, Archimandrite Antonin, with Conrad Schick, a German archaeologist and architect, supervised the excavations of the plot of land acquired by the Russian government in 1859 next to the Church of the Holy Sepulchre in Jerusalem. The excavations known as the "Russian Excavations", uncovered a number of archaeological findings dated to the time of Christ, including the "needle's eye", and the Threshold of Judgment Gate.

In 1886, Archimandrite Antonin purchased land in Jaffa, in southern Tel-Aviv, on which the tomb of the righteous Tavi (Acts: 9, 36) is located. Initially, a garden was planted on the land. In 1894, a temple was built, dedicated to the Apostle Peter, that was consecrated by Patriarch Gerasimus I of Jerusalem.

Archimandrite Antonin reposed on 24 March 1894.
