= Church of the Holy Forefathers and Monastery of the Holy Trinity =

Russian Orthodox church in Hebron, Palestine

Coordinates: 31.533°N 35.100°E

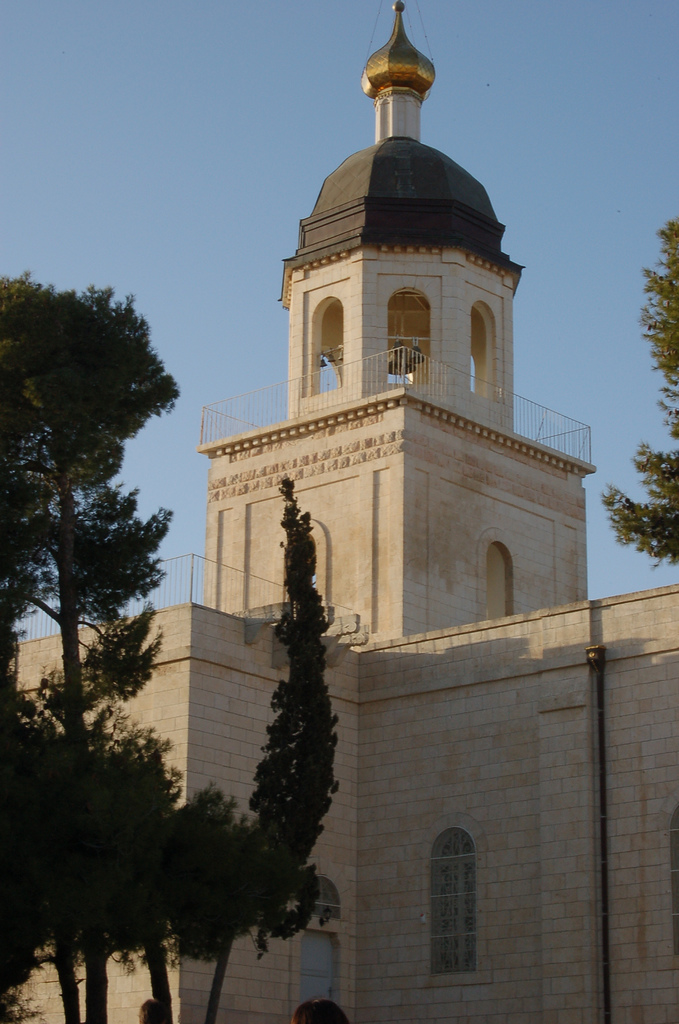
The monastery's belfry.

The Church of the Holy Forefathers and Monastery of the Holy Trinity (Russian: храм св. Праотцев и Троицкий монастырь), also known as Al Maskobiya (Arabic: كنيسة المسكوبية), is a Russian Orthodox monastery and church in Hebron, Israel, founded in the 20th century on the site of the ancient Oak of Mamre.

The lands were acquired by Archimandrite Antonin (Kapustin) for the Russian Church in the 19th century and later expanded. It was held by the Russian Orthodox Church Outside of Russia (ROCOR) until 1997, when Palestinian authorities turned the compound over to the Moscow-based Russian Orthodox Church. Ownership disputes continue, although the ROCOR in 2007 restored its ties as a semi-autonomous part of the Russian Orthodox Church.

It is located approximately 4 km to the southwest of Haram al-Ramat Mamre, the site of another "oak of Abraham" described by Josephus, surrounded with an enclosure by Herod the Great, and where Constantine the Great built a basilica in the 4th century.
