= Quercus pseudococcifera =

Scientific classification
- Kingdom: Plantae
- Clade: Embryophytes
- Clade: Tracheophytes
- Clade: Spermatophytes
- Clade: Angiosperms
- Clade: Eudicots
- Clade: Rosids
- Order: Fagales
- Family: Fagaceae
- Genus: Quercus
- Subgenus: Quercus subg. Cerris
- Section: Quercus sect. Ilex
- Species: Q. pseudococcifera

Binomial name
- Quercus pseudococcifera Desf.

Synonyms
- Quercus battandieri A.Camus; Quercus coccifera subsp. pseudococcifera (Desf.) Arcang.; Quercus coccifera subsp. mesto (Boiss.) Nyman; Quercus mesto Boiss.

Species of oak

Quercus pseudococcifera is a species of flowering plant in the beech family Fagaceae. It is a tree native to the west and central Mediterranean.

== Taxonomy ==
Quercus pseudococcifera was first described by René Louiche Desfontaines in 1799. It has often been treated as a subspecies, variety or form of Quercus coccifera. It is placed in section Ilex.

== Distribution ==
Quercus pseudococcifera is native to Algeria, Morocco and Tunisia in north Africa, and Portugal, Sardinia, Sicily and Spain in Europe.
